= 2026–27 National Basketball League (Bulgaria) season =

NBL
- Duration: 10 October 2026 – June 2027
- Games played: 182 (Regular season)
- Teams: 14
- TV partner: Max Sport

The 2026–27 National Basketball League season is the 86th season of the Bulgarian NBL.

== Teams ==
2026–27 Bulgarian National Basketball League club locations.

14 teams will participate as three teams joined the competition this season as Yambol and CSKA returned to the top flight after two years of absence, plus Polytechnica entered NBL for the first time.

Club	Last season	Arena	Location	Capacity
Balkan Botevgrad	1st	Arena Botevgrad	Botevgrad	4,500
Beroe	8th	Municipal Hall	Stara Zagora	800
Botev Academic	9th	SILA Hall	Plovdiv	1,600
Botev Vratsa	5th	Arena Botevgrad	Botevgrad	4,500
Cherno More Ticha	4th	Hristo Borisov Hall	Varna	800
Cherno More Ticha	4th	Kongresna Hall	Varna	5,116
CSKA Sofia	N/A	CSKA	Sofia	450
Minyor 2015	7th	Boris Gyuderov Hall	Pernik	1,700
Levski	10th	Triaditsa Hall	Sofia	530
Lokomotiv Plovdiv	2nd	SILA Hall	Plovdiv	1,600
Polytechnica	N/A	Dupnitsa Sports Hall	Dupnitsa	1,505
Rilski Sportist	3rd	Arena Samelyon	Samokov	3,000
Rilski Sportist	3rd	Arena Samokov	Samokov	2,500
Shumen	11th	Arena Shumen	Shumen	1,500
Spartak Pleven	6th	Balkanstroy Hall	Pleven	1,000
Yambol	N/A	Diana	Yambol	1,800

== Regular season ==
Teams play each other twice (home and away) for a total of 26 regular season games. The top 6 teams go directly to playoffs, the teams from 7-10 enter a play-in tournament for the last two spots of the playoffs, and the teams from 11-14 enter a placement tournament. The 2026-27 second league champion has the right to join NBL next season and if they do, the 14th placed team is relegated. if the 2026-27 second league runner up sends an application for the 2027-28 NBL season, they will play a relegation playoff with the 13th seed. The competition format was announced 30th of June after Federation meeting and the draw was held day later.

=== League table ===
Pos	Team	Pld	W	L	PF	PA	PD	Pts	Qualification
1	Minyor 2015	7	7	0	742	626	+116	14	Advance to playoffs
2	Rilski Sportist	7	6	1	629	525	+104	13	Advance to playoffs
3	Balkan Botevgrad	6	6	0	561	433	+128	12	Advance to playoffs
4	Spartak Pleven	7	5	2	576	526	+50	12	Advance to playoffs
5	Botev Academic	7	5	2	617	573	+44	12	Advance to playoffs
6	Lokomotiv Plovdiv	6	5	1	526	467	+59	11	Advance to playoffs
7	Cherno More	7	4	3	582	514	+68	11	Advance to Play-in
8	Shumen	7	4	3	614	613	+1	11	Advance to Play-in
9	Botev Vratsa	7	2	5	566	631	−65	9	Advance to Play-in
10	Beroe	7	1	6	635	621	+14	8	Advance to Play-in
11	Levski	7	1	6	569	647	−78	8	Advance to Placement Tournament
12	Yambol	7	1	6	534	652	−118	8	Advance to Placement Tournament
13	CSKA Sofia	7	1	6	546	682	−136	8	Advance to Placement Tournament
14	Polytechnica	7	0	7	495	682	−187	7	Advance to Placement Tournament

Updated to match(es) played on 22 November 2026. Source: NBL

=== Резултати ===
Home \ Away	BAL	BER	BOT	BVR	CMT	CSS	LEV	LPD	MIN	POL	RIL	SHU	SPA	YAM
Balkan						94–65	101–83	Jan 21			Dec 4			
Beroe					Dec 5			95–98		99–58	76–82			
Botev Academic		90–86				87–73	91–65	Dec 3	93–96					
Botev Vratsa	66–91	89–84	73–85			Dec 5	85–84	95–98						
Cherno More										85–66				87–61
CSKA Sofia					62–95				81–102	100–95		89–95		
Levski		94–91			76–93				82–96			85–90		Dec 5
Lokomotiv Plovdiv					85–69					87–65		85–77		
Minyor 2015		110–104		110–82								123–101	Dec 5	105–83
Polytechnica	75–114										65–95		71–102	
Rilski Sportist					84–79	114–76		88–79						
Shumen				87–84									67–77	97–70
Spartak Pleven	71–77							73–92		Dec 3	86–79			
Yambol	73–84		93–96	90–87							64–96			

Updated to match(es) played on = 22 November 2026. Source: NBL
Legend: Blue = home team win; Red = away team win.
Matches with lighter background shading were decided after overtime.

== Placement Tournament ==
The 11th host the last four teams from the table in round robin placement tournament.

Pos	Team	Pld	W	L	PF	PA	PD	Pts		TBD1	TBD2	TBD3	TBD4
11		0	0	0	0	0	0	0					
12		0	0	0	0	0	0	0					
13		0	0	0	0	0	0	0	Possible Relegation play-offs				
14		0	0	0	0	0	0	0	Possible Relegation				

First match(es) will be played: unknown. Source: NBL
Legend: Blue = home team win; Yellow = draw; Red = away team win.

== Play-in ==
The top six seeds advanced to the main rounds of playoffs, while the next four seeds participated in a Page playoff system tournament. The 7th-place team hosted the 8th-place team in the double-chance round needing to win one game to advance, with the winner clinching the 7th seed in the playoffs. The 9th-place team hosted the 10th-place team in the elimination round requiring two wins to advance, with the loser being eliminated from the contention. The loser in the double-chance round hosted the elimination-round game-winner, with the winner clinching the 8th seed and the loser being eliminated.

Play-in games
7
8
9
10

No. 8 seed game

Final seeds
7	No. 7 seed
8	No. 8 seed

== Playoffs ==
=== Bracket ===
Quarterfinals
1
8
4
5
2
7
3
6

Semifinals

Finals
Third place

== Player of the round ==
Round	Player	Team	PIR
1	(Bulgaria) Georgi Boyanov	Minyor 2015	30
2	(United States) Zawdie Jackson	Shumen	41
3	(United States) Mike Adewunm	Shumen	37
4	(United States) Jermaine Head	Minyor 2015	39
5	(Bulgaria) Nikolay Mihaylov	Botev Academic	42
7	(Serbia) Igor Kesar	Minyor 2015	32

== Bulgarian clubs in European competitions ==
Team	Competition	Progress
Balkan	EuroCup	Regular season
Lokomotiv Plovdiv	FIBA Europe Cup	Regular Season
Rilski Sportist	FIBA Europe Cup	Regular Season

== Bulgarian clubs in Regional competitions ==
Team	Competition	Progress
Spartak Pleven	European North Basketball League	Regular season
