= 2025–26 National Basketball League (Bulgaria) season =

NBL
- Duration: 4 October 2025 – June 2026
- Games played: 165 (Regular season)
- Teams: 11
- TV partner: Max Sport

Regular season
- Top seed: Rilski Sportist
- Season MVP: Khalil Miller (Lokomotiv Plovdiv)

Finals
- Champions: Balkan
- Runners-up: Lokomotiv Plovdiv
- Third place: Rilski Sportist
- Fourth place: Cherno More
- Finals MVP: (United States) Travis Mcconico (Balkan Botevgrad)

Statistical leaders
- Points: (Bulgaria) Georgi Gerganov (Botev Vratsa) - 21.7
- Rebounds: (United States) Khalil Miller (Lokomotiv Plovdiv) - 12.2
- Assists: (United States) Devearl Ramsey (Lokomotiv Plovdiv) - 7.4
- Index Rating: (United States) Khalil Miller (Lokomotiv Plovdiv) - 24.7

Records
- Biggest home win: Spartak 102–55 Shumen (9 April 2026)
- Biggest away win: Beroe 59–106 Balkan (12 December 2025)
- Highest scoring: Minyor 2015 109–103 Lokomotiv Plovdiv (4 March 2026)

The 2025–26 National Basketball League season was the 85th season of the Bulgarian NBL.

== Teams ==
2025–26 Bulgarian National Basketball League club locations.

11 teams will participate as two teams joined the competititon this season: BC Lokomotiv Plovdiv and Botev Vratsa.

Club	Last season	Arena	Location	Capacity
Academic Plovdiv	5th	SILA Hall	Plovdiv	1,600
Balkan Botevgrad	2nd	Arena Botevgrad	Botevgrad	4,500
Beroe	6th	Municipal Hall	Stara Zagora	800
Botev Vratsa	N/A	Arena Botevgrad	Botevgrad	4,500
Cherno More Ticha	3rd	Hristo Borisov Hall	Varna	800
Cherno More Ticha	3rd	Kongresna Hall	Varna	5,116
Minyor 2015	7th	Boris Gyuderov Hall	Pernik	1,700
Levski	8th	Triaditsa Hall	Sofia	530
Lokomotiv Plovdiv	1st (2nd division)	SILA Hall	Plovdiv	1,600
Rilski Sportist	1st	Arena Samelyon	Samokov	3,000
Rilski Sportist	1st	Arena Samokov	Samokov	2,500
Shumen	9th	Arena Shumen	Shumen	1,500
Shumen	9th	Mladost Hall	Shumen	900
Spartak Pleven	4th	Balkanstroy Hall	Pleven	1,000

== Regular season ==
Teams plays each other twice(home and away) for total of 20 games. After the 22nd round, the clubs will play an additional round, wher they 5 teams below them after 22 rounds in the standings once at home, and the 5 teams above them once away. Khalil Miller was named regular season MVP.

=== League table ===
Pos	Team	Pld	W	L	PF	PA	PD	Pts	Qualification
1	Rilski Sportist	30	25	5	2750	2349	+401	55	Advance to playoffs
2	Balkan Botevgrad	30	24	6	2732	2327	+405	54	Advance to playoffs
3	Cherno More	30	22	8	2748	2435	+313	52	Advance to playoffs
4	Lokomotiv Plovdiv	30	19	11	2735	2519	+216	49	Advance to playoffs
5	Botev Vratsa	30	16	14	2447	2486	−39	46	Advance to playoffs
6	Spartak Pleven	30	16	14	2471	2450	+21	46	Advance to playoffs
7	Minyor 2015	30	15	15	2609	2746	−137	45	Advance to playoffs
8	Beroe	30	11	19	2504	2675	−171	41	Advance to playoffs
9	Academic Plovdiv	30	9	21	2436	2615	−179	39	
10	Levski	30	5	25	2307	2730	−423	35	
11	Shumen	30	3	27	2372	2779	−407	33	

Source: NBL

=== Results ===
Home \ Away	ACP	BAL	BER	BVR	CMT	LEV	LPD	MIN	RIL	SHU	SPA	ACP	BAL	BER	BVR	CMT	LEV	LPD	MIN	RIL	SHU	SPA
Academic		95–106	67–86	78–74	95–94	78–66	90–86	70–85	72–86	95–68	83–62		77–91			84–103	87–88			73–86	105–100	
Balkan	87–66		94–74	106–74	85–82	96–58	83–80	118–75	75–70	102–67	103–75				93–86	80–79		82–90		79–78		75–82
Beroe	89–81	59–106		84–74	84–86	89–76	86–89	90–79	74–96	83–78	97–83	93–85	89–96				92–76			81–98	95–89	
Botev Vratsa	92–72	65–88	86–90		76–96	84–67	79–73	89–81	68–97	72–64	85–72	78–68		88–75			90–71		97–101			85–76
Cherno More	91–85	93–66	96–90	82–66		109–77	107–91	94–83	77–73	107–74	81–90			117–76	92–62			79–76	103–89			80–82
Levski	83–92	70–102	84–79	77–84	76–89		70–82	76–82	86–103	93–80	81–69		67–99			89–103		90–99		68–108	81–74	
Lokomotiv Plovdiv	98–93	89–94	117–88	105–87	77–86	115–80		88–72	72–84	96–59	91–75	91–59		96–83	90–98				109–94			77–67
Minyor 2015	83–80	81–99	88–84	84–88	72–91	90–85	109–103		87–100	93–90	88–85	89–84	99–93	87–82			103–90				113–96	
Rilski Sportist	96–68	81–79	94–73	92–87	96–84	105–70	74–78	89–77		98–71	85–80				96–89	81–73		100–92	89–77			109–88
Shumen	78–90	83–101	90–83	74–89	86–92	77–72	89–107	86–91	97–105		84–64		65–84		77–83	87–104		83–94		63–95		
Spartak Pleven	96–82	78–70	87–77	65–68	83–78	81–66	79–84	92–88	91–86	90–88		90–82		92–79			89–74		106–69		102–55	

Source: NBL
Legend: Blue = home team win; Red = away team win.
Matches with lighter background shading were decided after overtime.

== Playoffs ==
=== Bracket ===
Quarterfinals
1	Rilski Sportist	89	90
8	Beroe	69	80
4	Lokomotiv Plovdiv	79	86
5	Botev Vratsa	76	67
2	Balkan	105	103
7	Minyor 2015	66	83
3	Cherno More	88	74	94
6	Spartak Pleven	65	86	91

Semifinals
1	Rilski Sportist	87	97	89	88	87
4	Lokomotiv Plovdiv	79	75	99	99	92
2	Balkan	91	80	77
3	Cherno More	89	78	59

Finals
4	Lokomotiv Plovdiv	73	89	82	84	80
2	Balkan	88	94	77	78	81
Third place
1	Rilski Sportist	108	100
3	Cherno More	99	94

=== Quarterfinals ===
==== Rilski Sportist v Beroe ====
30 April 2026	Rilski Sportist	89–69 (Series: 1-0)	Beroe	Arena Samelyon, Samokov
19:00(UTC+03)	Scoring by quarter: 22-19, 22-15, 22-17, 23-18
	Pts: Vasov 17; Rebs: Bachkov 7 Asts: Karamfilov 7 PIR: Bachkov 20	Boxscore	Pts: Benjamin,Matushev 14; Rebs: Zahariev 8 Asts: Quisenberry 3 PIR: Zahariev 13	Attendance: 666

2 May 2026	Beroe	80–90 (Series: 0-2)	Rilski Sportist	Municipal Hall, Stara Zagora
19:15(UTC+03)	Scoring by quarter: 14-19, 25-23, 18-23, 23-25
Max Sport	Pts: Benjamin 13; Rebs: Williams 10; Asts: Quisenberry, Benjamin 3 PIR: Williams 20	Boxscore	Pts: Yanev 16; Rebs: Edwards 9 Asts: Karamfilov 9 PIR: Yanev 21	Attendance: 430

==== Lokomotiv Plovdiv v Botev Vratsa ====
30 April 2026	Lokomotiv Plovdiv	79–76 (Series: 1-0)	Botev Vratsa	Arena Sila, Plovdiv
19:15(UTC+03)	Scoring by quarter: 14-24, 22-22, 26-16, 17-14
Max Sport	Pts: Ramsey 20; Rebs: Miller 14; Asts: Singleton, Ramsey 5 PIR: Ramsey, Miller 22	Boxscore	Pts: Kalinov 25; Rebs: Haughton 8 Asts: Gerganov 3 PIR: Kalinov 21	Attendance: 750

2 May 2026	Botev Vratsa	67–86 (Series: 0-2)	Lokomotiv Plovdiv	Arena Botevgrad, Botevgrad
19:15(UTC+03)	Scoring by quarter: 12-25, 21-26, 14-17, 20-18
	Pts: Gerganov 17; Rebs: Haughton 7 Asts: Kalinov 4 PIR: Haughton 20	Boxscore	Pts: Singleton 20; Rebs: Miller 9 Asts: Ramsey 8 PIR: Miller 28	Attendance: 300

==== Balkan v Minyor 2015 ====
29 April 2026	Balkan	105–66 (Series: 1-0)	Minyor 2015	Arena Botevgrad, Botevgrad
19:00(UTC+03)	Scoring by quarter: 24-20, 22-21, 26-13, 33-12
	Pts: Mcconico 20; Rebs: Blakmon 6 Asts: Mcconico 6 PIR: Mcconico 25	Boxscore	Pts: Kesar 19; Rebs: Kesar 7 Asts: Toshkov 7 PIR: Kesar 14	Attendance: 450

1 May 2026	Minyor 2015	83–103 (Series: 0-2)	Balkan	Boris Gyuderov Hall, Pernik
18:00(UTC+03)	Scoring by quarter: 18-20, 23-26, 22-34, 20-23
	Pts: Kesar 18; Rebs: Kesar 7 Asts: Talley 7 PIR: Kesar 20	Boxscore	Pts: Green 18; Rebs: Dimitrov 9 Asts: Toshkov 6 PIR: Dimitrov 23	Attendance: 300

==== Cherno More v Spartak Pleven ====
29 April 2026	Cherno More	88–65 (Series: 1-0)	Spartak Pleven	Palace of Culture and Sports, Varna
18:00(UTC+03)	Scoring by quarter: 32-17, 13-20, 25-15, 18-13
Max Sport	Pts: Gaffney 18; Rebs: Gaffney 8 Asts: Watson-Gayle, Boyanov, West 4 PIR: Gaffney 25	Boxscore	Pts: McCloud 19; Rebs: Florveus 7 Asts: Rusev 4 PIR: McCloud 22	Attendance: 800

1 May 2026	Spartak Pleven	86–74 (Series: 1-1)	Cherno More	Balkanstroy Hall, Pleven
19:15(UTC+03)	Scoring by quarter: 24-21, 16-19, 25-18, 21-16
Max Sport	Pts: Ivanov 21; Rebs: Brown 10; Asts: McCloud 5 PIR: Brown 26	Boxscore	Pts: West 19; Rebs: Boyanov 10; Asts: Watson-Gayle 4 PIR: West 28	Attendance: 512

4 May 2026	Cherno More	94–91 (Series: 2-1)	Spartak Pleven	Arena Shumen, Shumen
19:15(UTC+03)	Scoring by quarter: 22-32, 29-25, 20-18, 23-16
Max Sport	Pts: Gaffney 23; Rebs: Boyanov 9 Asts: Boyanov 6 PIR: Gaffney 26	Boxscore	Pts: Ivanov 27; Rebs: Scott 7 Asts: McCloud 7 PIR: Ivanov 25	Attendance: 800

=== Semifinals ===
==== Rilski Sportist v Lokomotiv Plovdiv ====
10 May 2026	Rilski Sportist	87–79 (Series: 1-0)	Lokomotiv Plovdiv	Arena Samelyon, Samokov
20:00(UTC+03)	Scoring by quarter: 19-19, 23-23, 24-22, 21-15
Max Sport	Pts: Edwards, Davis 15; Rebs: Bachkov 6 Asts: Kostov, Bachkov 3 PIR: Edwards 13	Boxscore	Pts: Ramsey 17; Rebs: Singleton, Ramsey 5 Asts: Singleton 6 PIR: Ramsey 23	Attendance: 1,000

12 May 2026	Rilski Sportist	97–75 (Series: 2-0)	Lokomotiv Plovdiv	Arena Samelyon, Samokov
19:15(UTC+03)	Scoring by quarter: 24-15, 27-17, 16-21, 30-22
Max Sport	Pts: Arnett 28; Rebs: Arnett 6 Asts: Petrov, Karamfilov 5 PIR: Arnett 34	Boxscore	Pts: Kenderov 15; Rebs: Shaw Anderson 6 Asts: Singleton 7 PIR: Kenderov 16	Attendance: 700

15 May 2026	Lokomotiv Plovdiv	99–89 (Series: 1-2)	Rilski Sportist	Arena Sila, Plovdiv
19:15(UTC+03)	Scoring by quarter: 20-17, 26-21, 27-20, 26-31
Max Sport	Pts: Minkov 21; Rebs: Miller 11; Asts: Ramsey 10; PIR: Miller 26	Boxscore	Pts: Edwards 20; Rebs: Edwards 7 Asts: Petrov 6 PIR: Edwards 23	Attendance: 700

17 May 2026	Lokomotiv Plovdiv	99–88 (Series: 2-2)	Rilski Sportist	Arena Sila, Plovdiv
19:15(UTC+03)	Scoring by quarter: 22-22, 31-19, 28-21, 18-26
Max Sport	Pts: Miller 25; Rebs: Miller 9 Asts: Ramsey 8 PIR: Miller 33	Boxscore	Pts: Arnett 23; Rebs: Bachkov 9 Asts: Karamfilov 6 PIR: Bachkov, Arnett 27	Attendance: 720

20 May 2026	Rilski Sportist	87–92 (Series: 2-3)	Lokomotiv Plovdiv	Arena Samelyon, Samokov
19:15(UTC+03)	Scoring by quarter: 21-26, 16-26, 28-17, 22-25
Max Sport	Pts: Bachkov 20; Rebs: Edwards, Karamfilov 6 Asts: Karamfilov 10; PIR: Bachkov 24	Boxscore	Pts: Ramsey 20; Rebs: Minkov 11; Asts: Ramsey, Mihov 3 PIR: Miller 23	Attendance: 1,500

==== Balkan v Cherno More ====
9 May 2026	Balkan	91–89(OT) (Series: 1-0)	Cherno More	Arena Botevgrad, Botevgrad
19:15(UTC+03)	Scoring by quarter: 26-16, 21-20, 15-26, 20-20, Overtime: 9-8
Max Sport	Pts: Dimitrov 25; Rebs: Green 8 Asts: Dimitrov 7 PIR: Dimitrov 37	Boxscore	Pts: Boyanov 16; Rebs: Boyanov 9 Asts: Davis 6 PIR: Boyanov 25	Attendance: 1,850

11 May 2026	Balkan	80–78 (Series: 2-0)	Cherno More	Arena Botevgrad, Botevgrad
19:15(UTC+03)	Scoring by quarter: 27-14, 19-27, 14-19, 20-18
Max Sport	Pts: Mcconico, Green 19; Rebs: Mcconico 10; Asts: Mcconico, Blakmon, Toshkov 3 PIR: Mcconico 27	Boxscore	Pts: Davis 22; Rebs: Lamont West 7 Asts: Davis 7 PIR: Davis 27	Attendance: 1,000

14 May 2026	Cherno More	59–77 (Series: 0-3)	Balkan	Arena Shumen, Shumen
18:00(UTC+03)	Scoring by quarter: 14-19, 14-16, 20-13, 11-29
Max Sport	Pts: Gaffney 17; Rebs: Gaffney 9 Asts: Boyanov 4 PIR: Gaffney 20	Boxscore	Pts: Blakmon 20; Rebs: Green 13; Asts: Mcconico 5 PIR: Mcconico 22

=== Third place ===
==== Rilski Sportist v Cherno More ====
23 May 2026	Rilski Sportist	108–99 (Series: 1-0)	Cherno More	Arena Samelyon, Samokov
19:00(UTC+03)	Scoring by quarter: 33-22, 25-28, 28-29, 22-20
Max Sport	Pts: Vasov 33; Rebs: Bachkov, Edwards 8 Asts: Karamfilov 11; PIR: Vasov 31	Boxscore	Pts: West 31; Rebs: Petkov , Gaffney 6 Asts: Davis, Gaffney 3 PIR: West 30	Attendance: 600

25 May 2026	Cherno More	94–100 (Series: 0-2)	Rilski Sportist	Hristo Borisov Hall, Varna
20:00(UTC+03)	Scoring by quarter: 22-25, 17-26, 23-26, 32-23
Max Sport	Pts: Boyanov, Gaffney 22; Rebs: Boyanov, Gaffney 9 Asts: Davis 7 PIR: Gaffney 30	Boxscore	Pts: Davis, Yanev 19; Rebs: Karamfilov 7 Asts: Karamfilov 8 PIR: Arnett 20	Attendance: 500

=== Finals ===
==== Balkan v Lokomotiv Plovdiv ====
25 May 2026	Balkan	88–73 (Series: 1-0)	Lokomotiv Plovdiv	Arena Botevgrad, Botevgrad
19:15(UTC+03)	Scoring by quarter: 19-23, 24-16, 23-18, 22-16
Max Sport	Pts: Blakmon 16; Rebs: Blakmon 8 Asts: Blakmon 5 PIR: Blakmon 23	Boxscore	Pts: Miller, Mihov 14; Rebs: Shaw Anderson, Miller 7 Asts: Ramsey 8 PIR: Miller 16	Attendance: 1,800

27 May 2026	Balkan	94–89(OT) (Series: 2-0)	Lokomotiv Plovdiv	Arena Botevgrad, Botevgrad
19:15(UTC+03)	Scoring by quarter: 19-28, 27-19, 20-22, 15-12, Overtime: 13-8
Max Sport	Pts: Toshkov 24; Rebs: Green 16; Asts: Toshkov 4 PIR: Mcconico 22	Boxscore	Pts: Miller 26; Rebs: Miller 18; Asts: Singleton, Ramsey 5 PIR: Miller 43	Attendance: 1,800

30 May 2026	Lokomotiv Plovdiv	82–77 (Series: 1-2)	Balkan	Arena Sila, Plovdiv
19:15(UTC+03)	Scoring by quarter: 23-23, 19-14, 18-22, 22-18
Max Sport	Pts: Ramsey 33; Rebs: Minkov 5 Asts: Ramsey 5 PIR: Ramsey 39	Boxscore	Pts: Green 21; Rebs: Green 6 Asts: Mcconico 7 PIR: Green 27	Attendance: 1,500

1 June 2026	Lokomotiv Plovdiv	84–78 (Series: 2-2)	Balkan	Arena Sila, Plovdiv
19:15(UTC+03)	Scoring by quarter: 22-18, 20-25, 26-19, 16-16
Max Sport	Pts: Miller 18; Rebs: Miller 11; Asts: Ramsey 9 PIR: Miller 28	Boxscore	Pts: Mcconico 19; Rebs: Green 14; Asts: Mcconico 10; PIR: Mcconico 27	Attendance: 1,600

5 June 2026	Balkan	81–80 (Series: 3-2)	Lokomotiv Plovdiv	Arena Botevgrad, Botevgrad
19:15(UTC+03)	Scoring by quarter: 20-18, 18-21, 22-19, 21-22
Max Sport	Pts: Pishtikov 19; Rebs: Green 12; Asts: Mcconico 6 PIR: Mcconico 20	Boxscore	Pts: Singleton 20; Rebs: Miller 10; Asts: Singleton 6 PIR: Singleton 26	Attendance: 3,000

== Player of the round ==
Round	Player	Team	PIR
1	(United States) De'Sean Parsons	Beroe	35
2	(Serbia) Lazar Stankovic	Minyor 2015	27
3	(United States) Khalil Miller	Lokomotiv Plovdiv	40
4	(Bulgaria) Georgi Gerganov	Botev Vratsa	37
5	(United States) Demond Robinson	Balkan	30
6	(United States) Khalil Miller (2)	Lokomotiv Plovdiv	29
7	(Serbia) Igor Kesar	Minyor 2015	33
8	(United States) Khalil Miller (3)	Lokomotiv Plovdiv	39
9	(United States) Lamont West	Cherno More	46
10	(United States) Will Ellis	Shumen	35
11	(United States) Devearl Ramsey	Lokomotiv Plovdiv	26
12	(United States) Alonzo Gaffney	Cherno More	33
13	(United States) Lamont West (2)	Cherno More	28
14	(United States) Khalil Miller (4)	Lokomotiv Plovdiv	34
15	(United States) Khalil Miller (5)	Lokomotiv Plovdiv	36
16	(Bulgaria) Georgi Gerganov (2)	Botev Vratsa	39
17	(United States) Khalil Miller (6)	Lokomotiv Plovdiv	34
18	(United States) Michael Marsh	Shumen	31
19	(United States) Michael Marsh (2)	Shumen	30
20	(United States) Grant Singleton	Lokomotiv Plovdiv	40
21	(Serbia) Igor Kesar (2)	Minyor 2015	31
22	(United States) Lamont West (3)	Cherno More	31
23	(United States) Travis McConico	Balkan	27
24	(United States) DeMarcus Sharp	Academic	36
25	(United States) Jalan McCloud	Spartak	30
26	(United States) Khalil Miller (7)	Lokomotiv Plovdiv	35
27	(Serbia) Igor Kesar (3)	Minyor 2015	38
28	(United States) DeMarcus Sharp (2)	Academic	36
29	(Serbia) Igor Kesar (4)	Minyor 2015	32
30	(United States) Jelani Watson-Gayle	Cherno More	29
31	(Bulgaria) Tomislav Minkov	Lokomotiv Plovdiv	38
32	(Bulgaria) Georgi Gerganov (3)	Botev Vratsa	36
33	(United States) Khalil Miller (8)	Lokomotiv Plovdiv	30

== Bulgarian clubs in European competitions ==
Team	Competition	Progress
Rilski Sportist	FIBA Europe Cup	Regular season
Balkan	FIBA Europe Cup	Qualifying round

== Bulgarian clubs in Regional competitions ==
Team	Competition	Progress
Spartak Pleven	European North Basketball League	Regular season
