= 2026 Bulgarian Basketball Cup =

Bulgarian Basketball Cup
- Duration: 19 February 2026 – 22 February 2026
- Games played: 7
- Teams: 8
- TV partner: Max Sport

Regular season
- Season MVP: Lamont West

Finals
- Champions: Cherno More
- Runners-up: Lokomotiv Plovdiv
- Semifinalists: Balkan Botevgrad; Rilski Sportist
- Finals MVP: Lamont West

Statistical leaders
- Points: Lamont West 23
- Rebounds: Mihaylov 9.5
- Assists: Ramsey 9

Records
- Highest attendance: 2,000
- Lowest attendance: 200
- Average attendance: 929

The 2026 Bulgarian Basketball Cup was the 72nd edition of the annual cup tournament in Bulgaria. It is managed by the Bulgarian Basketball Federation and was heald in Arena Botevgrad, Botevgrad. The final eight of the competition began on 19 February 2026 with the quarterfinals, and ended with the final on 22 February 2026, while the qualifying stage started on 7th of January. MVP of the tournament and the final game, was Lamont West from Cherno More

== Format ==
In this edition, the Bulgarian Basketball Federation, introduced a new format. Clubs who participate in European Competitions (Balkan Botevgrad, Rilski Sportist, Spartak Pleven), the last year winner Cherno More Ticha and the highest placed team after the first 10 games in the standing, besides the other four, Lokomotiv Plovdiv, will qualify directly to the tournament. The other six teams will play two legged qualifying games.

== Qualification games ==
The qualifying round took place on 7th of January and 28 of January 2026 in two-legged ties in which the series winners advanced to the main tournament.

Team 1	Agg.	Team 2	1st leg	2nd leg
Academic Plovdiv	168 – 134	Botev Vratsa	85–68	83–66
Beroe	203 – 148	Shumen	108–76	95–72
Minyor 2015	166 – 153	Levski	90–81	76–72

== Draw ==
The draw for the 2026 Bulgarian Basketball Cup took place on 30 January 2026. There were no restrictions for quarterfinals.

== Bracket ==
Quarterfinals; 19–20 February
Beroe	101
Lokomotiv Plovdiv	117
Rilski Sportist	88
Academic Plovdiv	81
Balkan Botevgrad	85
Spartak Pleven	53
Minyor 2015	91
Cherno More Ticha	105

Semifinals; 21 February
Lokomotiv Plovdiv	100
Rilski Sportist	99
Balkan Botevgrad	76
Cherno More Ticha	77

Final; 22 February
Lokomotiv Plovdiv	87
Cherno More Ticha	88

== Quarterfinals ==
19 February	Beroe	101–117	Lokomotiv Plovdiv	Arena Botevgrad
16:00 (UTC+02)	Scoring by quarter: 22–31, 31-32, 21–31, 27-23
Max Sport 2	Pts: Matushev 32; Rebs: Matushev 36; Asts: Quisenberry 9 PIR: Matushev, Zahariev 5	Boxscore	Pts: Ramsey 23; Rebs: Krastanov 6 Asts: Ramsey 10; PIR: Ramsey 32	Attendance: 200

19 February	Rilski Sportist	88–81	Academic Plovdiv	Arena Botevgrad
19:00 (UTC+02)	Scoring by quarter: 22–25, 22-15, 21–19, 23-22
Max Sport 2	Pts: Arnett,Yanev 16; Rebs: Yanev 9 Asts: Karamfilov 6 PIR: Arnett 23	Boxscore	Pts: Bachev 22; Rebs: Mihaylov 12; Asts: Tomic 7 PIR: Bachev 22	Attendance: 400

20 February	Balkan Botevgrad	85–53	Spartak Pleven	Arena Botevgrad
19:00 (UTC+02)	Scoring by quarter: 21–4, 18-10, 20–16, 26-23
Max Sport 2	Pts: Pishtikov 17; Rebs: Ivanov 8 Asts: Toshkov 7 PIR: Pishtikov 17	Boxscore	Pts: Ivanov 9 Rebs: Brown 8 Asts: Ivanov 3 PIR: Brown 12	Attendance: 1200

20 February	Minyor 2015	91–105	Cherno More Ticha	Arena Botevgrad
16:00 (UTC+02)	Scoring by quarter: 25–29 , 18–25, 24–24, 20-27
Max Sport 2	Pts: Kesar 16; Rebs: Kesar, Stankovic 7 Asts: Toshkov 9 PIR: Stankovic 18	Boxscore	Pts: West 33; Rebs: Karačić 7 Asts: Petkov, Watson-Gayle 6 PIR: West 35	Attendance: 500

== Semifinals ==
21 February	Lokomotiv Plovdiv	100–99(OT)	Rilski Sportist	Arena Botevgrad
16:00 (UTC+02)	Scoring by quarter: 14–21 , 23–28, 29–20, 20-17, Overtime: 14-13
Max Sport 2	Pts: Miller 21; Rebs: Miller 10; Asts: Ramsey 10; PIR: Miller 26	Boxscore	Pts: Arnett 19; Rebs: Bachkov 14; Asts: Karamfilov 10; PIR: Arnett 22	Attendance: 700

21 February	Cherno More Ticha	77–76	Balkan Botevgrad	Arena Botevgrad
19:00 (UTC+02)	Scoring by quarter: 24–21, 14–26, 21–19, 18-10
Max Sport 2	Pts: West 18; Rebs: Gaffney 7 Asts: Watson-Gayle 8 PIR: Watson-Gayle 18	Boxscore	Pts: Toshkov 25; Rebs: Robinson 8 Asts: Pagenkopf 6 PIR: Toshkov 24	Attendance: 2000

== Finals ==
22 February 2026	Lokomotiv Plovdiv	87–88	Cherno More Ticha	Arena Botevgrad
17:00 (UTC+02)	Scoring by quarter: 28–20, 15–27, 18–19, 26-22
	Pts: Mihov 18; Rebs: Miller 10; Asts: Ramsey 8 PIR: Mihov 18	Boxscore	Pts: West 20; Rebs: Boyanov 7 Asts: Watson-Gayle 8 PIR: West 21	Attendance: 1500
