= Georgi Gerganov =

Bulgarian basketball player (born 2006)

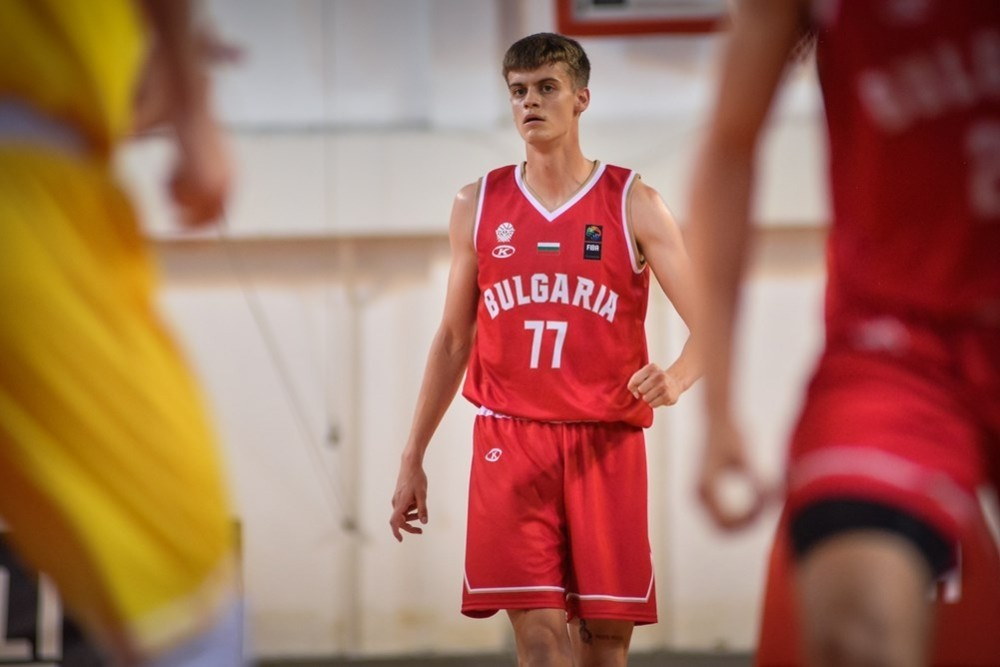

No. 77 – Bradley Braves
- Position: Point guard / shooting guard
- League: Missouri Valley Conference

Personal information
- Born: 22 July 2003 (age 23) Sliven, Bulgaria
- Listed height: 6 ft 3 in (1.91 m)
- Listed weight: 175 lb (79 kg)

Career information
- College: Bradley (2026-present)
- Playing career: 2019–present

Career history
- 2019–2023: Yambol
- 2023–2026: Balkan Botevgrad
- 2025–2026: → Botev Vratsa

Georgi Gerganov (Bulgarian: Георги Герганов; born 22 July 2003), is a Bulgarian college basketball player for the Bradley of the Missouri Valley Conference. He plays as a point guard or a shooting guard.

== College career ==
On 13 April 2026, Gerganov committed to NCAA Division I squad Bradley for the 2026–27 season. On 24 June, Gerganov suffered suffered a torn ACL in his left knee during a non-contact drill in a BU team workout.

== Professional career ==
Born in Sliven, but he spend his childhood in Yambol, where he started playing basketball at the age of 7. Gerganov played in every formation of the local club Yambol. He made his professional debut and scored his first points on 14 December 2019 against BC Beroe at the age of 16. He played а supporting role for the men's team, combining with matches for the youth formations and the B team. Gerganov signed his first professional contract at the start of 2022–23 season with Yambol.

The next season, he moved to Balkan Botevgrad. In his first season one of his best performance was a playoff loss against CSKA Sofia, where he scored 19 points. The next season his best game was a playoff win against Spartak Pleven, where he scored 19 points. In those two years his team finished second and third in the league. Gerganov also played in FIBA Europe Cup for the 2023–24 and 2024–25.

For the 2025-26 Gerganov was loaned to Botev Vratsa. In this year, Gerganov was given starting role, where he averaged 21.7 points 5.4 rebounds and 5.7 assist, making him the highest scoring player in the regular season. His team earned the fifth seed in the regular season and was defeated by Lokomotiv Plovdiv in the first round of the playoffs.

== Bulgarian national team ==
=== Junior national team ===
He played in three European Championship Division B Tournaments 2019 FIBA U16 European Championship Division B, 2022 FIBA U20 European Championship Division B and 2023 FIBA U20 European Championship Division B.

=== Senior national team ===
He made his debut against Netherlands and he scored his first points against Armenia.
