= Georgi Boyanov =

Bulgarian basketball player (born 1993)

No. 24 – BC Cherno More
- Positions: Small Forward, Power Forward
- League: NBL

Personal information
- Born: 9 May 1993 (age 33) Lovech, Bulgaria
- Listed height: 2.00 m (6 ft 7 in)
- Listed weight: 94 kg (207 lb)

Career information
- High school: General Vladimir Stoychev Sports School
- College: University of South Alabama
- NBA draft: 2017: undrafted
- Playing career: 2011–present

Career history
- 2011–2012: Overgas
- 2013–2017: South Alabama Jaguars
- 2017–2018: Eintracht Stahnsdorf
- 2018: Keflavík
- 2018–2019: Cherno More Ticha
- 2019–2020: Íþróttafélag Reykjavíkur
- 2020–2021: Kumanovo
- 2021: Cherno More Ticha
- 2021–2023: Chernomorets Buargas
- 2023–2024: CSKA Sofia
- 2024–2025: Balkan Botevgrad
- 2025–present: Cherno More Ticha

Career highlights
- NBL MVP (2019); NBL Top Scorer (2019); NBL Second place (2023); NBL Third place (2025); Bulgarian Super Cup (2025); Bulgarian Super Cup MVP (2025); Bulgarian Cup (2026)

Georgi Boyanov "Lovecha" (Bulgarian: Георги Боянов "Ловеча" born 9 May 1993) is a Bulgarian professional basketball player of Cherno More Ticha in National Basketball League.

== Early life ==
Before playing basketball Georgi Boyanov played football as a striker for local club Litex Lovech.

== College career ==
Georgi Boyanov played college basketball at South Alabama Jaguars when he sent on 7 October 2013. He played there for four years but didn't get drafted for the NBA.

== Club career ==
=== Overgas ===
Georgi Boyanov started his career at the BBL A group club Overgas Sofia where he played men's basketball for one year playing 35 matches on average playing 29.4 minutes, scoring 18 points, making 10.7 rebounds and giving out 2.4 assists before leaving to play college basketball.

=== Eintracht Stahnsdorf ===
After playing college basketball Georgi Boyanov went to German side Eintracht where he played one year.

=== Cherno More Ticha ===
On 19 October 2018 Georgi Boyanov returned to Bulgaria playing for NBL club Cherno More Ticha. Boyanov joined the club before their match against Levski Lukoil he debuted against them he played 7 minutes in a 102:67 loss. Boyanov won the NBL regular season MVP. After playing 1 season he played 20 games averaging 33.5 minutes scoring on average 22.2 points (most in the league), making 10.7 rebounds (most in the league) and making 1.8 assists.

=== Íþróttafélag Reykjavíkur ===
On 12 September 2019 Georgi Boyanov joined the silver medalist of Iceland Íþróttafélag Reykjavíkur. Boyanov was one of their best players being in the top 3 of the highest in the Úrvalsdeild karla. Boyanov played 20 games playing on average 33 minutes scoring 20.6 points, making 10.2 rebounds, giving 2.5 assists.

=== Kumanovo ===
On 28 October 2020 Georgi Boyanov joined Macedonian club Kumanovo. Boyanov played there for only 2 months.

=== Cherno More Ticha return ===
On 2 December 2020 Georgi Boyanov returned to Bulgaria and to Cherno More Ticha. After Boyanov's returning he played there until the end of the season. Boyanov played nine matches playing averaging 29.9 minutes scoring 18.4 points making 8 rebounds and giving 2.8 assists.

=== Chernomorets Burgas ===
On 20 July 2021 Georgi Boyanov signed for Chernomorets Burgas. After playing 24 matches averaging 33.6 minutes scoring 18.7 points making 8.7 rebounds ang giving 1.9 assists he signed a new contract for one more year. Boyanov became the captain of Chernomorets for the 2022-23 season after Konstantin Koev left. This season Chernomorets became second losing the playoffs final against Balkan Botevgrad losing 3:0. Boyanov played 28 matches playing on average 33.8 minutes he scored 17.5 points making 7.7 rebounds and he gave 1.7 assists.

=== CSKA Sofia ===
On 4 August 2023 Georgi Boyanov signed a two year contract for CSKA Sofia. Boyanov played only one season because CSKA stopped existing. Boyanov played 29 matches playing on average 33.8 minutes scoring 18.5 points making 8.5 rebounds and giving 2.7 assists.

=== Balkan Botevgrad ===
On 11 October 2024 Georgi Boyanov joined Balkan Botevgrad. Boyanov initially returned to but Chernomorets couldn't meet the financial fair play requirements and they ceased operating. On 18 April 2025 got injured and missed the rest of the season. Balkan finished the season at third after beating Spartak Pleven in the third place match up. Boyanov finished the season with 18 matches playing 25.9 minutes scoring 12.8 points making 7.2 rebounds and giving 1.4 assists.

=== Cherno More Ticha second return ===
On 5 September 2025 Georgi Boyanov returned for a third time to Varna to play again for Cherno More Ticha. On 28 September 2025 Boyanov made his debut in the Super Cup final against Rilski Sportist Cherno More won 66-84 and Boyanov won MVP. Boyanov is a key player in Cherno More's title battle. On 22 February 2026 Boyanov won his first Bulgarian Cup in a 88–87 win against Lokomotiv Plovdiv.

== Personal life ==
Georgi Boyanov created a youth basketball club in his hometown Lovech named BC Lovech.

== Honours ==
=== NBL ===
- Second place (1): 2023
- Third place (1): 2025
- Bulgarian Cup

Champion (1): 2026

=== Bulgarian Super Cup ===
- Winner (1): 2025
