= 2024–25 National Basketball League (Bulgaria) season =

NBL
- Duration: 4 October 2024 – June 2025
- Games played: 108 (Regular season)
- Teams: 9
- TV partner: Max Sport

Regular season
- Top seed: Rilski Sportist
- Season MVP: (Serbia) Igor Kesar (Spartak)

Finals
- Champions: Rilski Sportist
- Runners-up: Cherno More
- Third place: Balkan
- Fourth place: Spartak

Statistical leaders
- Points: (Bulgaria) Borislav Mladenov (Levski ) - 21.7
- Rebounds: (Bosnia and Herzegovina) Obrad Tomic (Academic Plovdiv) - 9.2
- Assists: (Bulgaria) Lachezar Toshkov (Minyor 2015) - 7.6
- Index Rating: (Serbia) Igor Kesar (Spartak) - 24.9

The 2024–25 National Basketball League (Bulgaria) season was the 84th season of the Bulgarian NBL.

== Teams ==
2024–25 Bulgarian National Basketball League club locations.

CSKA Sofia withdrew from the competition on 16 September due to financial difficulties. Chernomorets withdrew from the competition on September 29 after failing to register a team due to unpaid wages to players and coaches from the previous season. This required a new fixture draw for the upcoming season.

On October 1, just 3 days before the first game of the season Yambol also withdrew due to financial difficulties, as well as the reconstruction of their Diana arena and the lack of an available alternative basketball hall. They will participate in the second division for the 2024–25 season and confirmed their intention of returning to the NBL for the 2025–26 season.

Club	Last season	Arena	Location	Capacity
Academic Plovdiv	9th	SILA Hall	Plovdiv	1,600
Balkan Botevgrad	2nd	Arena Botevgrad	Botevgrad	4,500
Beroe	12th	Municipal Hall	Stara Zagora	800
Cherno More Ticha	6th	Hristo Borisov Hall	Varna	800
Cherno More Ticha	6th	Kongresna Hall	Varna	5,116
Minyor 2015	11th	Boris Gyuderov Hall	Pernik	1,700
Levski	8th	Triaditsa Hall	Sofia	530
Rilski Sportist	1st	Arena Samokov	Samokov	2,500
Rilski Sportist	1st	Arena Samelyon	Samokov	3,000
Shumen	7th	Arena Shumen	Shumen	1,500
Shumen	7th	Mladost Hall	Shumen	900
Spartak Pleven	4th	Balkanstroy Hall	Pleven	1,000

== Regular season ==
Before the withdrawal of Yambol and Chernomorets, the eleven teams should have played twice against each other for a total of 20 games. The league would then split into a top 6 and bottom 5, with each team playing two games against each of the other teams from the same group. The six teams from the first group and the best two teams from the second group would join the playoffs.

With nine teams, the teams will play each other twice, after which there will be an additional third cycle, where each team will have four home games against the four teams below them and four away games against the teams above them in the standings.

=== League table ===
Pos	Team	Pld	W	L	PF	PA	PD	Pts	Qualification
1	Rilski Sportist	24	21	3	2244	1851	+393	45	Advance to playoffs
2	Balkan Botevgrad	24	18	6	2108	1949	+159	42	Advance to playoffs
3	Cherno More	24	15	9	2064	1957	+107	39	Advance to playoffs
4	Spartak Pleven	24	14	10	2117	2013	+104	38	Advance to playoffs
5	Academic Plovdiv	24	13	11	1969	2037	−68	37	Advance to playoffs
6	Beroe	24	12	12	2114	2151	−37	36	Advance to playoffs
7	Minyor 2015	24	9	15	1990	2150	−160	33	Advance to playoffs
8	Levski	24	4	20	1846	2045	−199	28	Advance to playoffs
9	Shumen	24	2	22	1981	2280	−299	26	

Updated to match(es) played on 26 April 2025. Source: NBL

=== Results ===
==== Matches 1–16 ====
Teams played each other twice, once at home and once away.

Home \ Away	ACP	BAL	BER	CMT	LEV	MIN	RIL	SHU	SPA
Academic		91–101	79–77	67–64	84–83	107–83	87–97	91–77	82–80
Balkan	104–83		91–92	95–78	91–72	82–65	68–76	103–76	72–86
Beroe	85–73	106–110		76–95	83–71	115–90	66–111	105–98	92–80
Cherno More	91–90	75–80	102–88		97–60	107–82	82–77	89–81	88–91
Levski	75–90	71–83	58–66	72–80		91–88	64–74	96–91	81–96
Minyor 2015	91–72	69–87	89–73	91–74	81–80		75–87	101–76	91–82
Rilski Sportist	87–56	100–90	92–83	89–64	97–75	104–81		104–76	99–81
Shumen	74–76	67–68	91–93	108–118	79–78	74–90	73–103		93–89
Spartak	104–79	89–96	83–88	91–70	87–60	89–75	76–71	97–93	

Updated to match(es) played on 10 February 2025. Source: NBL
Legend: Blue = home team win; Red = away team win.
Matches with lighter background shading were decided after overtime.

==== Matches 17–24 ====
Teams played the 4 teams below them after 16 rounds once at home, and the 4 teams above them once away.

Home \ Away	ACP	BAL	BER	CMT	LEV	MIN	RIL	SHU	SPA
Academic					80–91	92–83	83–77	84–69	
Balkan	66–75		77–74	77–73					104–89
Beroe	94–100				84–76	99–79		107–104	
Cherno More	90–74		96–81			99–80			94–80
Levski		91–96		73–80			74–88	98–71	
Minyor 2015		73–90			86–82		76–104	97–90	
Rilski Sportist		103–75	116–109	85–75					97–74
Shumen		75–102		69–83			88–103		88–105
Spartak	94–74		87–78		93–74	94–74			

Updated to match(es) played on 12 April 2025. Source: NBL
Legend: Blue = home team win; Red = away team win.
Matches with lighter background shading were decided after overtime.

== Playoffs ==
=== Bracket ===
Quarterfinals
1	Rilski Sportist	88	89
8	Levski	79	66
4	Spartak	86	88	92
5	Academic	98	84	54
2	Balkan	87	86	102
7	Minyor 2015	85	88	75
3	Cherno More	100	91
6	Beroe	96	86

Semifinals
1	Rilski Sportist	102	105	93	82
4	Spartak	99	90	97	68
2	Balkan	72	94	78	78
3	Cherno More	82	86	86	80

Finals
1	Rilski Sportist	91	88	85	82
3	Cherno More	68	87	89	72
Third place
4	Spartak	88	98	69
2	Balkan	76	100	95

== Player of the round ==
Round	Player	Team	PIR
1	(United States) Anthony Walker	Beroe	39
2	(Bulgaria) Dimitar Marincheshki	Levski	33
3	(United States) Darius Banks	Beroe	32
4	(United States) Jordan Session	Rilski Sportist	39
5	(Bulgaria) Lachezar Toshkov	Minyor 2015	23
6	(Bulgaria) Borislav Mladenov	Minyor 2015	37
7	(Bulgaria) Borislav Mladenov (2)	Minyor 2015	30
8	(United States) Tyere Marshall	Balkan	41
9	(United States) Rey Idowu	Shumen	34
10	(United States) Anthony Walker (2)	Beroe	55
11	(United States) Daylen Williams	Academic Plovdiv	36
12	(Bulgaria) Nikolay Titkov	Academic Plovdiv	35
13	(United States) Michael Williams	Shumen	39
14	(United States) Anthony Walker (3)	Beroe	43
15	(Bulgaria) Borislav Mladenov (3)	Minyor 2015	29
16	(Bulgaria) Lachezar Toshkov (2)	Minyor 2015	42
17	(United States) Tyere Marshall (2)	Balkan	30
18	(Bulgaria) Simeon Lepichev	Spartak Pleven	31
19	(Bulgaria) Borislav Mladenov (4)	Levski	29
20	(United States) Tyere Marshall (3)	Balkan	34
21	(Serbia) Igor Kesar	Spartak Pleven	33
22	(United States) Zion Styles	Shumen	31
23	(United States) Michaelyn Scott	Cherno More	27
24	(United States) Brett Reed	Beroe	35
25	(United States) Brett Reed (2)	Beroe	46
26	(United States) Alan Arnett	Rilski Sportist	32
27	(United States) Sean Smith	Cherno More	35

== Bulgarian clubs in European competitions ==
Team	Competition	Progress
Rilski Sportist	FIBA Europe Cup	Regular season
Balkan	FIBA Europe Cup	Regular season

== Bulgarian clubs in Regional competitions ==
Team	Competition	Progress
Spartak Pleven	European North Basketball League	Regular season
