= David Haughton (basketball) =

American basketball player (born 1991)

No. 41 – Botev Vratsa
- Position: Power forward / center
- League: NBL Bulgaria

Personal information
- Born: August 1, 1991 (age 35) Greenburgh, New York, U.S.
- Listed height: 6 ft 6 in (1.98 m)
- Listed weight: 230 lb (104 kg)

Career information
- High school: Woodlands (Greenburgh, New York)
- College: Sullivan County CC (2010–2012); SUNY Purchase (2012–2014)
- NBA draft: 2014: undrafted
- Playing career: 2014–present

Career history
- 2014–2016: Rakvere Tarvas
- 2016–2017: Aries Trikala
- 2017–2018: Balkan Botevgrad
- 2018–2019: Hallmann Vienna
- 2019–2020: Rethymno Cretan Kings
- 2020–2021: Hallmann Vienna
- 2021–2022: Pelister
- 2022–2023: Spartak Pleven
- 2023–2024: TFT
- 2025–present: Botev Vratsa

Career highlights
- Skyline Conference Most Outstanding Player (2014)

David Michael Haughton (born August 1, 1991) is an American professional basketball player for TFT of the Macedonian First League. Haughton entered the 2014 NBA draft, but was not selected in the draft's two rounds.

== High school career ==
Haughton played high school basketball at Woodlands High School in Greenburgh, NY.

== College career ==
Haughton played college basketball at Sullivan County Community College, from 2010 to 2012. He transferred to Purchase State, where he played from 2012 to 2014 under coach Jeff Charney. During his first year with the Panthers, Haughton went to average 7.4 points, 6.7 rebounds and 0.6 blocks per game. Coming at his senior year, Haughton became team captain, was one of the key players, improved his numbers, averaging 9.3 points per game, and was the top team rebounder, with10.8 per game and 1.3 blocks per game.

== Professional career ==
=== Rakvere Tarvas ===
Following his status as undrafted in the 2014 NBA draft, Haughton signed with the Estonian team Rakvere Tarvas. After completing his first season, he extended his contract with the club for an additional year.

=== Aries Trikala ===
On October 4, 2016, he joined Aries Trikala of the Greek Basket League. He stayed at the club for one year, averaging 5.9 points and 4.8 rebounds per game.

=== Balkan Botevgrad ===
On August 3, 2017, Haughton joined Balkan Botevgrad of the Bulgarian league. He went on to average 7.4 points and 5.2 rebounds in 19.4 minutes per game.

=== Hallmann Vienna ===
On June 15, 2018, Haughton joined Vilpas Vikings of the Korisliiga. He never appeared in a team game and joined Hallmann Vienna of the Austrian Bundesliga.
