= Alonzo Gaffney =

American basketball player (born 2000)

No. 0 – Spartak Subotica
- Position: Power forward / center
- League: Serbian SuperLeague; ABA League; FIBA Champions League

Personal information
- Born: 28 January 2000 (age 26) Cleveland, Ohio, US
- Listed height: 207 cm (6 ft 9 in)
- Listed weight: 91 kg (201 lb)

Career information
- High school: Brewster Academy
- College: Ohio State Buckeyes (2019–2020); Northwest Florida State (2020–2021); Arizona State Sun Devils (2021–2024)
- Playing career: 2024–present

Career history
- 2024–2025: Umeå
- 2025–2026: Cherno More Ticha
- 2026–present: Spartak Subotica

Career highlights
- Bulgarian Super Cup winner (2025)

Alonzo Gaffney (born 28 January 2000) is an American professional basketball player for Spartak Subotica of the Serbian SuperLeague, the ABA League, and the FIBA Champions League.

== College career ==
In 2019 Alonzo Gaffney started his university career playing for Ohio State. He played there for one year until 2020. After this Gaffney joined the Northwest Florida State where he played again only for a year. In 2021 Gaffney joined the Arizona State Sun Devils. Gaffney played there for 3 years until 2024 when he graduated.

== Club career ==
=== Umeå ===
On July 30, 2024, Gaffney signed for Swedish club Umeå BSKT. Gaffney played there for 1 year being one of Umeå's best players averaging 13.1 points, 6.5 rebounds, 2 assists and 1.4 blocks.

=== Cherno More Ticha ===
On September 4, 2025, Gaffney joined the bulgarian NBL silver medalist and Bulgarian Cup winner Cherno More Ticha. Gaffney made his debut in a 88–64 win against NBL champion Rilski Sportist in the Bulgarian Super Cup final.

=== Spartak Subotica ===
On June 22 2026, Gaffney signed with Spartak Subotica of the Serbian SuperLeague and the ABA League.
