= DeMarcus Sharp =

American basketball player (born 1998)

Academic Plovdiv
- Position: Point guard
- League: NBL

Personal information
- Born: December 26, 1998 (age 27) Sikeston, Missouri, U.S.
- Listed height: 6 ft 3 in (1.91 m)
- Listed weight: 180 lb (82 kg)

Career information
- High school: Charleston (Charleston, Missouri)
- College: Moberly Area CC (2018–2019); Colby CC (2019–2020); Missouri State (2020–2022); Northwestern State (2022–2023); Austin Peay (2023–2024)
- Playing career: 2024–present

Career history
- 2024–2025: KK SPD Radnički
- 2026-present: Academic Plovdiv

Career highlights
- Southland Player of the Year (2023); First-team All-Southland (2023); Third-team All-Atlantic Sun (2024); Southland Newcomer of the Year (2023); Southland All-Defensive team (2023); MVC All-Newcomer team (2021)

DeMarcus Lee Sharp (born December 26, 1998) is an American basketball player. He played college basketball for Austin Peay, Northwestern State, Missouri State, Colby Community College and Moberly Area Community College.

Sharp began his college career at Moberly Area Community College, then moved to Colby Community College in Kansas for his sophomore year. At the close of his sophomore season, he was named a first-team junior college All-American.

From junior college, Sharp transferred to Missouri State. He had a strong first season for the Bears, averaging 8.2 points and 3.7 assists per game and earning a spot on the Missouri Valley Conference all-newcomer team. But his second season was marred by injury as a stress fracture limited him to only eight games. At the end of the season, Sharp opted to transfer.

After former Missouri State assistant Corey Gipson was named head coach for the Northwestern State Demons, Sharp chose to follow. He averaged 19.5 points, 5 rebounds and 5 assists per game for the Demons, earning Southland Player of the Year and Newcomer of the Year honors.

For the 2023–24 season, Sharp transferred to a fifth school, Austin Peay of the ASUN Conference.
