= Tsonkov =

Tsonkov is a surname. Notable people with the surname include:

- Stanislav Tsonkov (born 1991), Bulgarian basketball player
- Stefan Tsonkov (born 1995), Bulgarian footballer
- Tsvetomir Tsonkov (born 1981), Bulgarian footballer
