= 2026–27 FIBA Europe Cup =

European basketball competition

- Season: 2026–27
- Dates: Qualifying: 23–30 September 2026; Competition proper: 7 October 2026–28 April 2027
- Teams: Competition proper: 48 (from at most 25 countries); Total: Up to 51 (from at most 25 countries)

The 2026–27 FIBA Europe Cup will be the 12th season of the FIBA Europe Cup, a European basketball competition for clubs launched by FIBA Europe.

== Team allocation ==
Up to 51 teams from at most 25 of the 50 FIBA Europe member associations are set to participate in the 2026–27 FIBA Europe Cup season. On 15 May 2026, the FIBA Europe Board approved the proposal of expanding the FIBA Europe Cup competition to 48 clubs in regular season in which teams will be placed in eight groups of six, with the top two in each group advancing to the second round.

=== Teams ===
The labels in the parentheses show how each team qualified for the place of its starting round:

- 1st, 2nd, 3rd, etc.: League position after eventual Playoffs
- CL QR: Transferred from Champions League qualifying rounds

Qualified teams for 2026–27 FIBA Europe Cup (by entry round)
Regular season
(Basketball Austria) Vienna (3rd)	(British Basketball) Manchester Basketball (3rd)	(Polish Basketball Federation) Zastal Zielona Góra (2nd)
(Azerbaijan Basketball Federation) Absheron Lions (2nd)	(Georgian Basketball Federation) Batumi (1st)	(Polish Basketball Federation) Dziki Warsaw (3rd)
(Azerbaijan Basketball Federation) Gence (3rd)	(German Basketball Federation) Fitness First Würzburg Baskets (5th)	(Polish Basketball Federation) King Szczecin (5th)
(Basketball Belgium) Filou Oostende (2nd)	(German Basketball Federation) Vet-Concept Gladiators Trier (8th)	(Portuguese Basketball Federation) Benfica (2nd)
(Bulgarian Basketball Federation) Lokomotiv Plovdiv (2nd)	(Hellenic Basketball Federation) Mykonos (7th)	(Portuguese Basketball Federation) Sporting CP (3rd)
(Bulgarian Basketball Federation) Rilski Sportist (3rd)	(Hellenic Basketball Federation) Kolossos H Hotels (8th)	(Romanian Basketball Federation) CSM CSU Raiffeisen Oradea (2nd)
(Croatian Basketball Federation) Split (3rd)	(Hellenic Basketball Federation) Iraklis (9th)	(Romanian Basketball Federation) SCM U Craiova (3rd)
(Cyprus Basketball Federation) Petrolina AEK Larnaca (1st)	(Hellenic Basketball Federation) Promitheas Patras (10th)	(Spanish Basketball Federation) Río Breogán (11th)
(Cyprus Basketball Federation) Keravnos (2nd)	(Hungarian Basketball Federation) NHSZ-Szolnoki Olajbányász (2nd)	(Spanish Basketball Federation) FIATC Girona (12th)
(Czech Basketball Federation) Opava (3rd)	(Basketball Federation of Kosovo) Trepça (1st)	(Swiss Basketball) Lions de Genève (2nd)
(Danish Basketball Association) Bakken Bears (1st)	(Basketball Federation of Kosovo) Bashkimi (2nd)	(Slovak Basketball Association) Patrioti Levice (1st)
(Estonian Basketball Association) Tartu Ülikool Maks & Moorits (1st)	(Latvian Basketball Association) Valmiera Glass ViA (1st)	(Slovak Basketball Association) Nitra Blue Wings (3rd)
(Estonian Basketball Association) Bigbank/Kalev (2nd)	(Latvian Basketball Association) VEF Rīga (4th)	(Turkish Basketball Federation) Esenler Erokspor (8th)
(French Federation of Basketball) Élan Chalon (9th)	(Basketball Federation of North Macedonia) MZT Skopje Aerodrom (1st)	(Turkish Basketball Federation) Yukatel Denizli Basket (9th)
(French Federation of Basketball) SLUC Nancy (10th)	(Basketball Nederland) Landstede Hammers (1st)	(Turkish Basketball Federation) Biotekno Körfez Basket (11th)
Qualifying round
(Azerbaijan Basketball Federation) Neftçi (4th)	(Estonian Basketball Association) BC Pärnu (4th)	(Romanian Basketball Federation) Dinamo București (4th)
(Croatian Basketball Federation) Samobor (5th)	(Basketball Federation of Kosovo) Peja (4th)	(Slovak Basketball Association) Prievidza (4th)

=== Opt-in teams ===
The following teams of the Champions League qualifying rounds had opted in to participate in the FIBA Europe Cup in case they do not reach the Champions League regular season:

- (German Basketball Federation) Fitness First Würzburg Baskets
- (German Basketball Federation) Rasta Vechta
- (Hellenic Basketball Federation) Kolossos H Hotels
- (Hellenic Basketball Federation) Promitheas Patras
- (Swiss Basketball) Fribourg Olympic
- (Swiss Basketball) Lions de Genève
- (Turkish Basketball Federation) Yukatel Denizli Basket
- (Turkish Basketball Federation) Glint Manisa Basket
- (Basketball Austria) Vienna
- (Azerbaijan Basketball Federation) Absheron Lions
- (Bulgarian Basketball Federation) Rilski Sportist
- (Cyprus Basketball Federation) Petrolina AEK Larnaca
- (Czech Basketball Federation) Opava
- (Danish Basketball Association) Bakken Bears
- (Georgian Basketball Federation) Batumi
- (Latvian Basketball Association) VEF Rīga
- (Polish Basketball Federation) Dziki Warsaw
- (Portuguese Basketball Federation) Benfica
- (Romanian Basketball Federation) CSM CSU Raiffeisen Oradea
- (Slovak Basketball Association) Patrioti Levice
- (British Basketball) Manchester Basketball

== Round and draw dates ==
The schedule of the competition will be as follows.

Schedule for 2026–27 FIBA Europe Cup
Phase	Round	Draw date	First leg	Second leg
Qualifying round		16 July 2026	23 September 2026	30 September 2026
Regular season	Round 1	16 July 2026	6–7 October 2026	
Regular season	Round 2	16 July 2026	13–14 October 2026	
Regular season	Round 3	16 July 2026	20–21 October 2026	
Regular season	Round 4	16 July 2026	27–28 October 2026	
Regular season	Round 5	16 July 2026	3–4 November 2026	
Regular season	Round 6	16 July 2026	10–11 November 2026	
Regular season	Round 7	16 July 2026	17–18 November 2026	
Regular season	Round 8	16 July 2026	8–9 December 2026	
Regular season	Round 9	16 July 2026	15–16 December 2026	
Regular season	Round 10	16 July 2026	22–23 December 2026	
Second round	Round 1	16 July 2026	5–6 January 2027	
Second round	Round 2	16 July 2026	12–13 January 2027	
Second round	Round 3	16 July 2026	19–20 January 2027	
Second round	Round 4	16 July 2026	26–27 January 2027	
Second round	Round 5	16 July 2026	2–3 February 2027	
Second round	Round 6	16 July 2026	9–10 February 2027	
Play-offs	Quarter-finals	16 July 2026	10 March 2027	17 March 2027
Play-offs	Semi-finals	16 July 2026	31 March 2027	7 April 2027
Play-offs	Finals	16 July 2026	21 April 2027	28 April 2027

== Qualifying round ==
The qualifying round will take place from 23 to 30 September 2026 in two-legged ties in which the series winners will advance to the regular season. As clubs that have opted in from the Champions League qualifying rounds could qualify to the Champions League regular season, this could led to additional spots in the regular season of the FIBA Europe Cup opening up to be filled by the best losers series in the qualifying round.

Team 1	Agg.	Team 2	1st leg	2nd leg
Prievidza (Slovak Basketball Association)	201–148	(Croatian Basketball Federation) Samobor	103–83	98–65
Peja (Basketball Federation of Kosovo)	141–201	(Romanian Basketball Federation) Dinamo București	58–96	83–105
BC Pärnu (Estonian Basketball Association)	140–141	(Azerbaijan Basketball Federation) Neftçi	67–80	73–61

Source: FIBA

=== Lucky losers ===
The additional spots were made available after Rasta Vechta qualified for the Basketball Champions League. The one lucky loser was determined by the best loser series from the FIBA Europe Cup Qualifying Round in accordance to Section D of the Official Basketball Rules.

Pos	Team	PF	PA	PD	Qualification
1	(Estonian Basketball Association) Transcom Pärnu	140	141	−1	Advance to regular season
2	(Croatian Basketball Federation) Samobor	148	201	−53	
3	(Basketball Federation of Kosovo) Peja	141	201	−60	

Source: FIBA

== Regular season ==
The regular season will be played by 48 teams divided into 12 groups of four in which 24 teams receive direct spots, at least 3 teams will advance from the qualifying round and at most 21 teams will come from the Champions League qualifying rounds. It will begin on 6 October 2026 and will conclude on 23 December 2026. In each group, teams will play against each other home-and-away in a round-robin format. And the end of the regular season, the top two team from each regular season group will advance to the second round, while the rest of the teams will be eliminated after the regular season.

Ongoing suspension of Russian and Belarussian teams in FIBA competitions has been still active. There will be no teams from Ukraine in any European basketball competition for the first time since the 2014–15 season. No team from Israel will participate in the competition for the fourth season in-a-row.

=== Group A ===
Pos	Team	Pld	W	L	PF	PA	PD	Pts	Qualification	TRI	TRE	PRO	SPL	OPA	BAT
1	(German Basketball Federation) Vet-Concept Gladiators Trier	7	7	0	702	507	+195	14	Advance to second round	—	96–59	102–89	100–80		92–59
2	(Basketball Federation of Kosovo) Trepça	7	4	3	559	575	−16	11	Advance to second round		—	77–91	94–88	89–80	
3	(Hellenic Basketball Federation) Promitheas Patras	7	4	3	629	593	+36	11		83–87	81–71	—		112–92	91–76
4	(Croatian Basketball Federation) Split	7	4	3	577	576	+1	11			69–78	88–82	—	81–77	
5	(Czech Basketball Federation) Opava	7	2	5	603	583	+20	9		80–103			68–74	—	104–62
6	(Georgian Basketball Federation) Batumi	7	0	7	463	699	−236	7		57–122	70–91		77–97	62–102	—

Updated to match(es) played on 18 November 2026. Source: FIBA
Legend: Blue = home team win; Red = away team win.

=== Group B ===
Pos	Team	Pld	W	L	PF	PA	PD	Pts	Qualification	GIR	OOS	ZGA	OLA	LEV	DIN
1	(Spanish Basketball Federation) FIATC Girona	7	5	2	628	538	+90	12	Advance to second round	—	80–88	109–68	103–66	90–66	87–75
2	(Basketball Belgium) Filou Oostende	7	5	2	558	547	+11	12	Advance to second round	76–91	—		86–77	71–70	84–80
3	(Polish Basketball Federation) Zastal Zielona Góra	7	5	2	597	587	+10	12			80–77	—		71–74	95–93
4	(Hungarian Basketball Federation) NHSZ-Szolnoki Olajbányász	7	3	4	569	603	−34	10		81–79		80–90	—		104–73
5	(Slovak Basketball Association) Patrioti Levice	7	2	5	524	559	−35	9		88–90	69–76		79–85	—	
6	(Romanian Basketball Federation) Dinamo București	7	1	6	574	616	−42	8		84–92			93–76	76–78	—

Updated to match(es) played on 19 November 2026. Source: FIBA
Legend: Blue = home team win; Red = away team win.

=== Group C ===
Pos	Team	Pld	W	L	PF	PA	PD	Pts	Qualification	ERO	KOL	SCP	CRA	RIL	GEN
1	(Turkish Basketball Federation) Esenler Erokspor (Q)	7	7	0	691	488	+203	14	Advance to second round	—		106–70	118–96	113–62	92–63
2	(Hellenic Basketball Federation) Kolossos H Hotels	7	5	2	570	499	+71	12	Advance to second round	69–71	—		77–65		79–78
3	(Portuguese Basketball Federation) Sporting CP	7	3	4	549	577	−28	10			71–69	—	89–95	79–75	
4	(Romanian Basketball Federation) SCM U Craiova	7	3	4	623	667	−44	10			82–104	77–97	—	103–86	105–96
5	(Bulgarian Basketball Federation) Rilski Sportist	7	2	5	461	557	−96	9		62–94	70–92	86–76		—	20–0
6	(Azerbaijan Basketball Federation) Gence	7	1	6	434	540	−106	8		66–97	62–80	69–67			—

Updated to match(es) played on 18 November 2026. Source: FIBA
Legend: Blue = home team win; Red = away team win.
(Q) Qualified for the phase indicated

=== Group D ===
Pos	Team	Pld	W	L	PF	PA	PD	Pts	Qualification	SLU	KIN	KER	VIE	NBW	PAR
1	(French Federation of Basketball) SLUC Nancy	7	6	1	623	499	+124	13	Advance to second round	—		86–73	66–65	99–60	100–64
2	(Polish Basketball Federation) King Szczecin	7	5	2	616	566	+50	12	Advance to second round	90–87	—		95–76	88–81	
3	(Cyprus Basketball Federation) Keravnos	7	5	2	555	513	+42	12				—		70–53	88–70
4	(Basketball Austria) Vienna	7	2	5	559	606	−47	9		86–101	96–93	83–85	—		
5	(Slovak Basketball Association) Nitra Blue Wings	7	2	5	526	599	−73	9			92–90	78–88	80–84	—	82–80
6	(Estonian Basketball Association) BC Pärnu	7	1	6	495	591	−96	8		61–84	69–82	65–86	86–69		—

Updated to match(es) played on 18 November 2026. Source: FIBA
Legend: Blue = home team win; Red = away team win.

=== Group E ===
Pos	Team	Pld	W	L	PF	PA	PD	Pts	Qualification	DZI	IRA	WUE	AEK	TAR	MZT
1	(Polish Basketball Federation) Dziki Warsaw	7	6	1	624	571	+53	13	Advance to second round	—			94–80	91–84	89–66
2	(Hellenic Basketball Federation) Iraklis	7	5	2	606	529	+77	12	Advance to second round	85–86	—	90–73	81–64		103–73
3	(German Basketball Federation) Fitness First Würzburg Baskets	7	4	3	580	536	+44	11		91–62	73–83	—	78–76	113–79	87–73
4	(Cyprus Basketball Federation) Petrolina AEK Larnaca	7	3	4	566	579	−13	10		89–99		73–65	—	99–93	
5	(Estonian Basketball Association) Tartu Ülikool Maks & Moorits	7	3	4	621	675	−54	10		76–103	101–100			—	93–77
6	(Basketball Federation of North Macedonia) MZT Skopje Aerodrom	7	0	7	509	616	−107	7			59–64		69–85	92–95	—

Updated to match(es) played on 18 November 2026. Source: FIBA
Legend: Blue = home team win; Red = away team win.

=== Group F ===
Pos	Team	Pld	W	L	PF	PA	PD	Pts	Qualification	CHA	KOR	KLV	VAL	MCR	BAS
1	(French Federation of Basketball) Élan Chalon	7	5	2	605	501	+104	12	Advance to second round	—	96–65	68–74	109–77	79–72	
2	(Turkish Basketball Federation) Biotekno Körfez Basket	7	5	2	589	540	+49	12	Advance to second round	74–65	—	101–75		112–71	72–62
3	(Estonian Basketball Association) Bigbank/Kalev	7	4	3	565	583	−18	11			86–78	—	83–81		88–84
4	(Latvian Basketball Association) Valmiera Glass VIA	7	3	4	567	583	−16	10			85–87	82–74	—	80–74	85–77
5	(British Basketball) Manchester Basketball	6	2	4	474	534	−60	8		73–94		89–85		—	
6	(Basketball Federation of Kosovo) Bashkimi	6	1	5	452	511	−59	7		66–94			79–77	84–95	—

First match(es) will be played: 18 November 2026. Source: FIBA
Legend: Blue = home team win; Red = away team win.

=== Group G ===
Pos	Team	Pld	W	L	PF	PA	PD	Pts	Qualification	SLB	BAK	GVA	MER	PRI	ABS
1	(Portuguese Basketball Federation) Benfica	7	5	2	636	581	+55	12	Advance to second round	—	94–79		96–91	98–83	97–76
2	(Danish Basketball Association) Bakken Bears	7	5	2	569	569	0	12	Advance to second round	81–91	—	77–69			91–88
3	(Swiss Basketball) Lions de Genève	7	4	3	598	581	+17	11		93–90	73–78	—	76–80	97–96	85–77
4	(Turkish Basketball Federation) Yukatel Denizli Basket	7	3	4	567	571	−4	10		78–70	76–80		—	83–69	
5	(Slovak Basketball Association) Prievidza	7	3	4	617	611	+6	10			78–83		86–73	—	108–84
6	(Azerbaijan Basketball Federation) Absheron Lions	7	1	6	595	669	−74	8				83–105	94–86	93–97	—

Updated to match(es) played on 18 November 2026. Source: FIBA
Legend: Blue = home team win; Red = away team win.

=== Group H ===
Pos	Team	Pld	W	L	PF	PA	PD	Pts	Qualification	MYK	ORA	VEF	LKP	FRI	NFT
1	(Hellenic Basketball Federation) Mykonos	7	5	2	570	529	+41	12	Advance to second round	—	89–79	83–85	86–84	66–71	78–58
2	(Romanian Basketball Federation) CSM CSU Raiffeisen Oradea	7	5	2	622	581	+41	12	Advance to second round		—	92–84	104–99	93–67	
3	(Latvian Basketball Association) VEF Rīga	7	5	2	666	563	+103	12		88–91		—	106–83		96–55
4	(Bulgarian Basketball Federation) Lokomotiv Plovdiv	7	3	4	599	605	−6	10			79–69		—	95–83	76–72
5	(Swiss Basketball) Fribourg Olympic	7	2	5	509	590	−81	9		65–80	80–86	65–97		—	78–73
6	(Azerbaijan Basketball Federation) Neftçi	7	1	6	519	617	−98	8		84–80	83–99	94–110			—

Updated to match(es) played on 18 November 2026. Source: FIBA
Legend: Blue = home team win; Red = away team win.

== Individual awards ==
=== MVP of the Month ===
Month	Player	Team	Ref.
2026
October	(United States) Mac McClung	(Spanish Basketball Federation) Bàsquet Girona	

== See also ==
- 2026–27 EuroLeague
- 2026–27 EuroCup Basketball
- 2026–27 Basketball Champions League
