= Jelani Watson-Gayle =

British-Jamaican basketball player

No. 3 – Winnipeg Sea Bears
- Position: Point guard
- League: CEBL

Personal information
- Born: 9 September 1998 (age 28) London, United Kingdom
- Listed height: 181 cm (5 ft 11 in)
- Listed weight: 86 kg (190 lb)

Career information
- High school: Westminster Schools of Augusta
- College: Benedict College Tigers 2017–2018; Miles College Golden Bears 2018–2021; Fresno Pacific Sunbirds 2021–2022
- NBA draft: 2022: undrafted
- Playing career: 2022–present

Career history
- 2022–2023: Bristol Flyers
- 2023: Winnipeg Sea Bears
- 2023–2024: Brussels
- 2024–2025: Slavia Praha
- 2025–present: Cherno More Ticha
- 2026: Winnipeg Sea Bears

Career highlights
- CEBL champion (2026)

Jelani Watson-Gayle (born 9 September 1998) is a British-Jamaican professional basketball player who plays as a Point guard for Cherno More Ticha of the Bulgarian National Basketball League.

== College career ==
From 2017 to 2022 Watson-Gayle played college basketball for the Benedict College Tigers, Miles College Golden Bears, and Fresno Pacific Sunbirds. Watson-Gayle played for all three teams in Division II of the American college basketball.

== Club career ==
=== Bristol Flyers ===
On 5 August 2022 Watson-Gayle signed his first professional contract signing for a one-year deal, with the option of a further year for the Bristol Flyers. Watson Gayle played there for a year being one of their most important players coming of primarily from the bench avaraging 12.7 points 3.3 rebounds and assists. Watson-Gayle was in the 2023 BBL All British Team Of The Year.

=== Winnipeg Sea Bears ===
On 15 May 2023 Watson-Gayle signed a summer contract to the newest franchise of the Canadian Elite Basketball League the Winnipeg Sea Bears. Watson-Gayle played for them for the 2023 CEBL season where the 'Ursus maritimus' were eliminated in the Play-in round. He was crowned 2023 CEBL Sixth Man of the Year. Watson-Gayle avaraged 12.5 points, 3.6 rebounds and 3.4 assists.

=== Brussels ===
On 24 June 2023 Watson-Gayle signed for BNXT League club Brussels Basketball. Watson-Gayle was one of their key players in the 2023–24 season for the belgians avaraging 9.9 points, 2.4 rebounds and assists.

=== Slavia Praha ===
On 5 July 2024 Watson-Gayle transferred to the Czech NBL club Slavia Praha.

=== Cherno More Ticha ===
On 2 September 2025 Watson-Gayle signed for Bulgarian NBL silver medalist and Bulgarian Cup winner Cherno More Ticha. On 28 September 2025 Watson-Gayle won his first trophy in his career in his debut for Cherno More winning the 2025 Bulgarian Super Cup in an 88–64 win against Rilski Sportist.

=== Winnipeg Sea Bears return ===
On 15 July 2026 Jelani Watson-Gayle signed a summer contract to return to the Winnipeg Sea Bears.

== International career ==
=== Great Britain U20 ===
Watson-Gayle first featured for Great Britain in FIBA youth competition, notably at the 2018 FIBA U20 European Championship. Across 7 games, he averaged 7.9 points, 3.6 rebounds, and 3.1 assists per game, playing a key role in the backcourt and demonstrating his all-around game against Europe’s top U20 talent.

=== Great Britain ===
On 14 February 2023 Watson-Gayle was called up for the first time for the Great Britain men's national team while playing for the Bristol Flyers. Watson-Gayle made his first appearances in World Cup qualifiers losses against Belgium (59–88) and Serbia (83–101). In early 2024, Watson-Gayle was named in the Great Britain roster for the FIBA EuroBasket 2025 qualifying windows. The squad list published for the qualifiers included him as part of the extended group of point guards representing Great Britain as they contested qualifying matches against European competition. In August 2025, Watson-Gayle was named in Great Britain’s training squad for their pre-EuroBasket preparation tour, which included warm-up games against France, Belgium, Bosnia & Herzegovina, Slovenia and Estonia ahead of the main tournament. Later that month, he secured his place on the official 12-man roster for the FIBA EuroBasket 2025 final tournament. Great Britain’s squad announcement confirmed his inclusion representing Great Britain in Tampere and across the EuroBasket group stage.
