= BC Cherno More =

Bulgarian basketball club

Cherno More Navibulgar
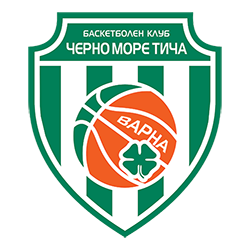
- Nickname: The Sailors (Моряците)
- Leagues: NBL
- Founded: 1923; 103 years ago
- Arena: Hristo Borisov Hall
- Capacity: 1,000
- Location: Varna, Bulgaria
- Team colors: White & Green
- President: Georgi Ganchev
- Head coach: Fotis Takianos
- Most recent season position: 2nd
- Championships: 3 Bulgarian Leagues; 6 Bulgarian Cups; 1 Bulgarian Super Cup
- Website: chernomoreticha.com
Home	Away

BC Cherno More Navibulgar (Bulgarian: БК Черно море Навибулгар) is a Bulgarian professional basketball club based in Varna. The last time it won a championship was in 1999.

== Home arenas ==
Cherno More Ticha plays most of their home games in the Hristo Borisov Hall sometimes they play at the Kongresna Hall in their bigger matches.

== History ==
Basketball in Varna began in 1923 being a part of the Ticha sport club. After the creation of BC Ticha it was created BC Vladislav and BC Diana who are part of the Cherno More sports club. In the period between 1935 until 1944 there was no basketball in Varna. In 1944 basketball returned to Varna after the creation of BC Primorets. In 1948 Ticha-Vladislav-Primorets wins 1948 Varna Cup. In 1952 Vladimir Pinzov was hired as the first manager for the club. In 1952 also TVP debuted in the NBL finishing first of the non-Sofian clubs. Until 1969 Cherno More sometimes played in the first division of Bulgaria but primarily being in the second division. From 1970 until 1982 'the sailors' established themselves in the Bulgarian championship. In 1975 Cherno More debuted in European competitions playing in the FIBA Korać Cup eliminating Karşıyaka in the second round 185–173. In the Group Stage Cherno More finished last in a group with Tus 04 Leverkusen, Partizan and Sinudyne Bologna. From 1982 until the end of the century Cherno More had their best period in their history. In 1984 Cherno More for the first time finished third. In 1984 Cherno More again played in the Korać Cup eliminating İTÜ 165–161 in the first round. In the second round they were eliminated against Stroitel Kyiv losing 158–174. In 1985 Cherno More won their first Bulgarian Championship. In 1985 Georgi Glushkov signed for the Phoenix Suns who is the first player from Eastern Europe to play in the NBA. In 1985 Cherno More played for the first time in the FIBA European Champions Cup. In the first round they eliminated AEL Limassol winning 202–113. In the second round they lost to Žalgiris 222–152. In 1987 Cherno More again participated in the Korać Cup losing in the first round to Beşiktaş losing 156–145. From 1990 to 1997 Cherno More lost 4 NBL finals and finished third once. In the 1996–97 Korać Cup Cherno More won 184–143 against in the qualifying round against Omonia. In the group stage they finished fourth in a group with Bnei Herzliya, Cagiva Varese and Mazowszanka. In 1998 Cherno More won their first Bulgarian Cup and after 13 years they won the NBL against Slavia Sofia in the final winning 3–1 on aggregate. In 1999 Cherno More again won the Bulgarian Cup and the NBL winning in the final 3–2 against Levski Sofia. In 1998 and 1999 Cherno More played in the FIBA Saporta Cup in 1998 they were knocked out in the group stage finishing fifth out of 6 teams but in 1999 they passed the preliminary round finishing third in their group. Cherno More were knocked out in the round of 32 losing to Zadar 133–172. In 2000 Cherno More almost won the NBL and the Bulgarian Cup but they lost the Bulgarian League final against Levski Sofia despite that they won the cup. In 2001 Cherno More reached the Bulgarian Cup for the fourth time in a row but they lost the final 92–70 against Levski. In the League they finished third. From 2003 until 2008 Cherno More lost 3 Cup finals in 2003, 2005 and 2008. In 2005 they finished third. In 2006 Cherno More lost the NBL final against Lukoil Academic losing 3–0. In 2008–09 and in 2009–10 Cherno More played in the BIBL. In the first season they were knocked out in the quarterfinals against Feršped Rabotnički losing 139−143. In the second season they reached the semifinals being eliminated by Levski losing 91–76. In 2014 Cherno More finished third and lost the cup final against Levski. In 2015 Cherno More won the Bulgarian Cup for the first time for 15 years winning against Lukoil Academic 69–72. From 2016 until 2024 it was their worst period in their history being one of the worst teams in the NBL and not even qualifying for the playoffs in most years. In 2025 Cherno More won the Bulgarian Cup again after 10 years against Balkan Botevgrad winning 89–81. In the 2024–25 season Cherno More finished second after losing the final 3–1 in the series against Rilski Sportist. But in the 2025 Bulgarian Super Cup 'the sailors' took their revenge against Rilski winning the final 66–84. In 2026 Cherno More again won the Bulgarian Cup against Lokomotiv Plovdiv winning 88–87.

== Players ==
Note: Flags indicate national team eligibility at FIBA-sanctioned events. Players may hold other non-FIBA nationalities not displayed.

=== Current roster ===
As of 23 February 2026

Cherno More Ticha roster
Players
Coaches

Pos.	No.	Nat.	Name	Ht.	Wt.	Age
PF	0	(United States)	Gaffney, Alonzo	2.07 m (6 ft 9 in)	91 kg (201 lb)	26 – 28 January 2000
G/F	1	(Bulgaria)	Moldov, Mihail	1.97 m (6 ft 6 in)	89 kg (196 lb)	25 – 13 March 2001
PG	3	(United Kingdom)	Watson-Gayle, Jelani	1.84 m (6 ft 0 in)	86 kg (190 lb)	28 – 9 September 1998
SF	5	(United States)	West, Lamont	2.03 m (6 ft 8 in)	99 kg (218 lb)	29 – 2 June 1997
CG	6	(Bulgaria)	Hadzhirusev, Evgeni	1.93 m (6 ft 4 in)	87 kg (192 lb)	30 – 11 December 1995
G/F	7	(Bulgaria)	Grozdev, Vladislav	1.91 m (6 ft 3 in)	74 kg (163 lb)	17 – 8 July 2009
G/F	8	(Bulgaria)	Stoyanov, Nikolay (C)	1.95 m (6 ft 5 in)	92 kg (203 lb)	32 – 10 March 1994
G	10	(Bulgaria)	Popov, Martin	1.91 m (6 ft 3 in)	75 kg (165 lb)	18 – 19 January 2008
F	13	(Bulgaria)	Marinov, Marin	2.04 m (6 ft 8 in)	95 kg (209 lb)	26 – 9 August 2000
PF/C	15	(Bulgaria)	Chernokozhev, Tsvetomir	1.95 m (6 ft 5 in)	85 kg (187 lb)	26 – 1 June 2000
SG	17	(United States)	Davis, Darell	1.93 m (6 ft 4 in)	80 kg (176 lb)	30 – 9 May 1996
C	19	(Bulgaria)	Uzunov, Christopher	2.11 m (6 ft 11 in)	109 kg (240 lb)	19 – 26 September 2007
PF/C	21	(Croatia) (Bosnia and Herzegovina)	Karačić, Ivan	2.04 m (6 ft 8 in)	93 kg (205 lb)	30 – 20 February 1996
SG	23	(Bulgaria)	Kolev, Stanislav	1.75 m (5 ft 9 in)	60 kg (132 lb)	19 – 2 August 2007
F	24	(Bulgaria)	Boyanov, Georgi	2.00 m (6 ft 7 in)	94 kg (207 lb)	33 – 9 May 1993
G	35	(Bulgaria)	Petkov, Ventsislav	1.88 m (6 ft 2 in)	80 kg (176 lb)	34 – 14 October 1991
C	39	(Bulgaria)	Slavov, Svetoslav	2.05 m (6 ft 9 in)	110 kg (243 lb)	18 – 5 February 2008

Head coach

- (Bulgaria) Vassil Evtimov

Assistant coach(es)

- (Bulgaria) Veselin Veselinov
- (Bulgaria) Mihail Kapitanov

Physiotherapist(s)

- (Bulgaria) Petko Petkov

Legend

- (C) Team captain
- Injured

- Roster
Updated: 27 December 2025

=== Notable players ===
Note: Flags indicate national team eligibility at FIBA-sanctioned events. Players may hold other non-FIBA nationalities not displayed.

Criteria

To appear in this section a player must have either:

- Set a club record or won an individual award while at the club
- Played at least one official international match for their national team at any time
- Played at least one official NBA match at any time.

- (Bulgaria) Bozhidar Avramov
- (Bulgaria) Georgi Boyanov
- (Bulgaria) Tsvetomir Chernokozhev
- (Bulgaria) Deyan Ivanov
- (Bulgaria) Kaloyan Ivanov
- (Bulgaria) Stanimir Marinov
- (Bulgaria) Georgi Glushkov
- (Bulgaria) Yulian Radionov
- (Bulgaria) Todor Stoykov
- (Bulgaria) Stanislav Tsonkov
- (Bulgaria) Asen Velikov
- (Bulgaria) Aleksandar Yanev
- (Croatia) (Bosnia and Herzegovina) Ivan Karačić
- (United States) Rodney Purvis
- (United Kingdom) Jelani Watson-Gayle

== Honours ==
- NBL

Champions (3): 1985, 1998, 1999
Second place (8): 1990, 1991, 1996, 1997, 2000, 2006, 2009, 2025
Third place (7): 1984, 1993, 2001, 2005, 2007, 2014, 2015

- Bulgarian Cup

Champions (6): 1998, 1999, 2000, 2015, 2025, 2026

- Bulgarian Super Cup

Champions (1): 2025
Runners-up (1): 2026
