= Spartak Euroins =

- Arena: Universiada Hall
- Capacity: 4,000
- Location: Sofia, Bulgaria
- Championships: 4 Bulgarian Leagues; 3 Bulgarian Cups

BC Spartak Sofia was a professional basketball club based in Sofia, Bulgaria and part of the Spartak Sofia sports club. Spartak played in the 2004–05 FIBA Europe Cup, where the club had a 3–3 record and was eliminated in the conference quarter-finals. The club was sponsored by insurance group Euroins Bulgaria.

== History ==
Created as part of Spartak Sofia sports club, under police department ownership. The club existed until 22 January 1969, when they merge with BC Levski Sofia.Consequently, BC Levski Sofia became Levski-Spartak. The club was restored 1992, as BC Spartak MVR, where MVR stands for Ministry of Interior. In 2002 they became Spartak Euroins, for sponsorship reasons. In 2003-04 they got promoted to A1, remaining there for four seasons. In the end of 2005-06 season Euroins step aside from the club and they switch back to Spartak MVR. In 2008, Spartak closed their representative team due to financial difficulties, spending the last season (2007-08) in the second tier league. After four years, the club was restored under the name Spartak Capitol due to sponsorship reasons. But the team lasted only one season, 2012-2013 in the second tier league.

== Honours ==
- Bulgarian Championship
  - Winners (4): 1962, 1960, 1956, 1954.
  - Runners-up (2): 1958, 1947.
  - Bronze medalist (1): 1948.
- Bulgarian Cup
  - Winners (3): 1968, 1967, 1951.
