= Aleksandar Yanev =

Bulgarian basketball player (born 1990)

No. 12 – Rilski Sportist
- Position: Small forward / power forward
- League: NBL; BIBL

Personal information
- Born: 20 January 1990 (age 36) Varna, Bulgaria
- Listed height: 2.03 m (6 ft 8 in)
- Listed weight: 104 kg (229 lb)

Career information
- Playing career: 2006–present

Career history
- 2006–2012: Cherno More Varna
- 2012: Kavala
- 2012–2013: Bàsquet Manresa
- 2013–2014: Lukoil Academic
- 2014–2015: Güssing Knights
- 2015: Levski Sofia
- 2015–2016: Club San Martín de Corrientes
- 2016: Kožuv
- 2017: Zadar
- 2017–2020: Beroe
- 2020–2021: Cherno More Varna
- 2021–2022: Beroe
- 2022–present: Rilski Sportist

Aleksandar Yanev (born 20 January 1990) is a Bulgarian professional basketball player. He currently plays for Beroe. He is also a member of the Bulgarian national team.

== Career ==
Yanev began his pro career with the Bulgarian League club Cherno More Varna, during the 2006–07 season. In February 2012 joined for two months Greek side Kavala.

On 11 January 2017, he signed for Zadar
