= Igor Kesar =

Serbian basketball player

Personal information
- Born: November 4, 1992 (age 34) Kraljevo, Serbia, FR Yugoslavia
- Listed height: 6 ft 10.75 in (2.10 m)
- Listed weight: 265 lb (120 kg)

Career information
- NBA draft: 2014: undrafted
- Playing career: 2011–present
- Position: Power forward / center

Career history
- 2011–2012: Sloga
- 2012: Plana
- 2012–2014: Napredak Kruševac
- 2014–2015: Tamiš
- 2015–2016: Igokea
- 2016–2017: Tamiš
- 2017: Spartak Subotica
- 2017–2018: Balkan Botevgrad
- 2018–2019: PVSK Panthers
- 2019: Kožuv
- 2019–2020: BC Rilski Sportist
- 2020–2022: Pelister
- 2022–2024: Timișoara
- 2024: Iraklis
- 2025–: Spartak Pleven

Career highlights
- Bulgarian League MVP (2025); Bulgarian League All-Star (2018); Serbian League Best Five (2017); Bosnian League champion (2016); Bosnian Cup winner (2016)

Igor Kesar (born 4 November 1992) is a Serbian professional basketball player. Standing at 2.10 m (6 ft 10 1/2 in), he plays at the power forward and the center positions.

== Professional career ==
Kesar started his pro career on 2011 with Sloga of the Basketball League of Serbia. The following season, he joined KK Plana but he left the club in order to join Napredak Aleksinac. He stayed with the club for two seasons, before joining Tamiš on 2014.

That was a breakthrough season for Kesar who lead his team to 4.spot in the championship and ultimately the club managed to play in the Superliga against the powerhouses like Partizan and Crvena Zvezda. Kesar scored last seconds three pointer away against Vrsac in a direct duel between two clubs for that 4.spot and a place in Superliga. He ended up that season with 11.,5 points, 4 rebounds per game with an incredible 53% 3 point shots (the #1 in the league).

On 2015, he signed a one-year deal with the Bosnian club Igokea. With Igokea, Kesar won the Bosnian League and the Bosnian Cup. The following season, he returned to Tamiš, but he left the club at the end of the regular season to join Spartak Subotica for the Superliga competition.

On 2017, he joined Balkan Botevgrad of the Bulgarian league. He went on to average 14.6 points and 5.6 rebounds in 26.1 minutes per game. During the season, he led Balkan to the NBL finals, where Balkan lost from Levski Sofia.

Balkan also competed in the 2017/2018 edition of the Fiba Europe Cup where Kesar had 13.5 points and 5.5 rebound per game.

On June 27, 2018, he signed with Peristeri of the Greek Basket League. But he left the team on September 25, 2018 to sign for PVSK Panthers of the Hungarian Basketball League.

Kesar had a solid half-season averaging 10.9 points and 4.9 rebounds but despite that he left the team on the January 15, 2019 and signed for KK Kozuv of the Macedonian Basketball League.

He led the team from Djevdjelija to a Superleague spot and ended the season with 16.4 points and 5.9 rebounds per game. He was named MVP of the round 3 times with some great double double performances. He also played six games in the Balkan League with an average score of 20.3 points and 5.6 rebounds.

On August 19, 2019, he signed for Rilski Sportist of the NBL.

He averaged 12.2 points and 5.4 rebounds in the domestic league.

On June 16, 2020 he signed with KK Pelister of the Macedonian First League making him first import player for the new season.
