= BC Botev Academic =

Bulgarian Basketball Club

- Nickname: Студентите (The Students)
- Leagues: NBL
- Founded: 1948; 78 years ago
- History: Academic Plovdiv (1948–2010) (2020-2026); Academic Bultex 99 (2010–2020); Botev Academic (2026–Present)
- Arena: SILA Hall
- Capacity: 1,600
- Location: Plovdiv, Bulgaria
- Team colors: Yellow, Black
- President: Vasil Vrachev
- Head coach: Jordan Yankov
- Website: botevbasketball.bg
Home	Away

BC Botev Academic (Bulgarian: БК Ботев Академик) is a professional basketball club based in Plovdiv, Bulgaria. The team competes in the National Basketball League, the highest division of Bulgaria. Botev plays its home games at the Arena SILA.

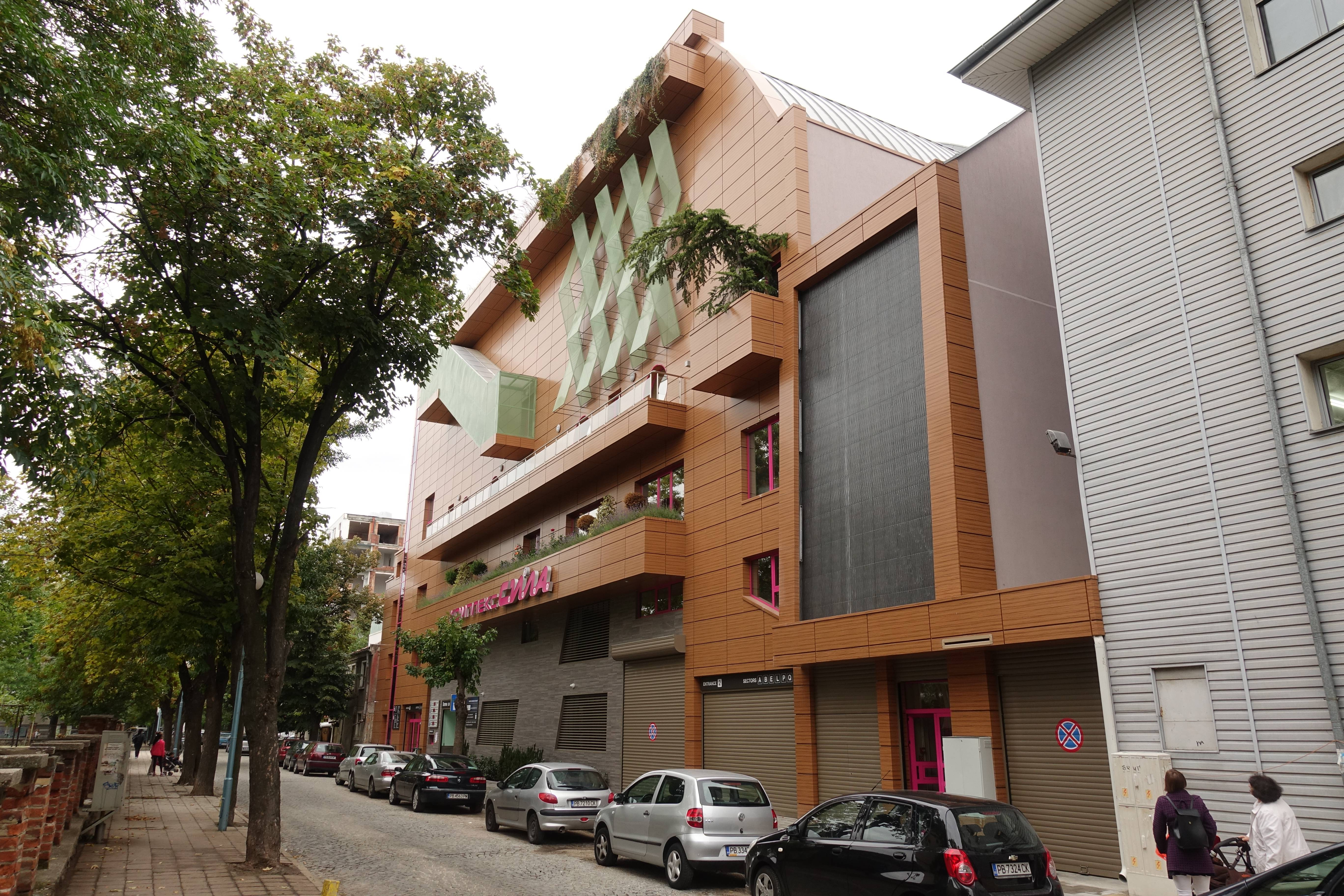
Arena Sila

== History ==
In the 2021–22 season, Academic played in the FIBA Europe Cup, marking the club's debut in Europe. On September 11th 2026, Academic changed its name to Botev Academic, making connection with Plovdiv's football club Botev Plovdiv.

== Honours ==
- National Basketball League
  - Third place (1): 2021
- Bulgarian Cup
  - Runners-up (1): 1956
- Balkan League
  - Runners-up (1): 2021
  - Third place (1): 2019
- Divison A (II Tier)
  - Third place (1): 2011
- Cup of BFB (II tier)
  - Runners-up (1): 2011
  - Third place (2): 2012, 2015

== Seasons ==
Season	Name	Tier	Division	Pos.	W–L	Postseason	W–L	Bulgarian Cup	European competitions	BIBL
2016-17	Academic Bultex 99	1	NBL	2nd	16–8	Quarterfinalist	1-2	Fourth	-	-
2017-18	Academic Bultex 99	1	NBL	2nd	18–6	Fourth	3-6	Semifinalist	-	QF
2018-19	Academic Bultex 99	1	NBL	4th	13–11	Quarterfinalist	0-2	Semifinalist	-	3rd
2019-20	Academic Bultex 99	1	NBL	6th	8–11	Canceled		Quarterfinalist	-	Canc.
2020-21	Academic Plovdiv	1	NBL	5th	11–13	Third place	4-4	Quarterfinalist	-	2nd
2021-22	Academic Plovdiv	1	NBL	7th	12–15	Quarterfinalist	1-2	Quarterfinalist	FIBA Europe Cup - QR	SR
2022-23	Academic Plovdiv	1	NBL	8th	11–19	Quarterfinalist	1-2	DNQ	-	-
2023-24	Academic Plovdiv	1	NBL	9th	13–19	DNQ		Quarterfinalist	-	-
2024-25	Academic Plovdiv	1	NBL	5th	13–11	Quarterfinalist	1-2	Quarterfinalist	-	-
2025-26	Academic Plovdiv	1	NBL	9th	9–21	DNQ		Quarterfinalist	-	-
2026-27	Botev Academic	1	NBL	TBD	TBD	TBD		TBD	-	-

== European competitions ==
Season	Competition	Round	Club	Home	Away	Aggregrate
2021–22	FIBA Europe Cup	First qualifying round	(Greece) Iraklis	75–95 (in Sofia)		
