= Bulgarian Basketball Cup =

Basketball competition in Bulgaria

- Current season, competition or edition: 2026 Bulgarian Basketball Cup
- Founded: 1951
- No. of teams: 8
- Country: Bulgaria
- Confederation: FIBA Europe
- Most recent champions: Cherno More Ticha (6 title)
- Most titles: BC CSKA Sofia (17 titles)
- Broadcaster: Max Sport
- Related competitions: NBL; Super Cup
- Website: nbl.basketball.bg

The Bulgarian Basketball Cup is an annual cup competition, organized by the Bulgarian Basketball Federation since 1951. The cup was not held in 1957, 1958, 1960 and 1961. BC CSKA Sofia is the all-time record holder with 17 titles.

== Format ==
Since 2009, except from 2017 to 2019, the Final Eight format has been used and from 2010 only teams from the first tier participate in it. The eight teams play a play-off at one venue, over four days, eventually producing a winner. From 2017 to 2019, the quarterfinals and semifinals are played in a double-legged format, while the final was played in one game on a neutral venue. The top six teams, from NBL, have an automatic bye to quarterfinals, while the other three and five teams from A Group League (second tier) play preliminary rounds for a place in the quarterfinals.

== Title holders ==
- 1951 Spartak Sofia
- 1952 Academic Sofia
- 1953 CDNA
- 1954 Academic Sofia
- 1955 CDNA
- 1956 Transport High School
- 1957 Not held
- 1958 Not held
- 1959 Slavia Sofia
- 1960 Not held
- 1961 Not held
- 1962 CDNA
- 1963 CDNA
- 1964 VIF
- 1965 Botev Burgas
- 1966 Lokomotiv Sofia
- 1967 Spartak Sofia
- 1968 Spartak Sofia
- 1969 Levski-Spartak
- 1970 Balkan Botevgrad
- 1971 Levski-Spartak
- 1972 Levski-Spartak
- 1973 CSKA
- 1974 CSKA
- 1975 Chernomorets
- 1976 Levski-Spartak
- 1977 CSKA
- 1978 CSKA
- 1979 Levski-Spartak
- 1980 Levski-Spartak
- 1981 CSKA
- 1982 Levski-Spartak
- 1983 Levski-Spartak
- 1984 CSKA
- 1985 CSKA
- 1986 Balkan Botevgrad
- 1987 Balkan Botevgrad
- 1988 Balkan Botevgrad
- 1989 CSKA
- 1990 CSKA
- 1991 CSKA
- 1992 CSKA
- 1993 Levski Totel
- 1994 CSKA
- 1995 Kompact Dimitrovgrad
- 1996 Plama Pleven
- 1997 Slavia Sofia
- 1998 Cherno More Sodi
- 1999 Cherno More
- 2000 Cherno More
- 2001 Levski
- 2002 Lukoil Academic
- 2003 Lukoil Academic
- 2004 Lukoil Academic
- 2005 CSKA
- 2006 Lukoil Academic
- 2007 Lukoil Academic
- 2008 Lukoil Academic
- 2009 Levski
- 2010 Levski
- 2011 Lukoil Academic
- 2012 Lukoil Academic
- 2013 Lukoil Academic
- 2014 Levski
- 2015 Cherno More Port Varna
- 2016 Rilski Sportist
- 2017 Beroe
- 2018 Rilski Sportist
- 2019 Levski
- 2020 Levski
- 2021 Rilski Sportist
- 2022 Rilski Sportist
- 2023 Levski
- 2024 Chernomorets
- 2025 Cherno More
- 2026 Cherno More

== Recent finals ==
| Year | Venue | Final | | | Third place | | |
| Year | Venue | Gold Medalists | Score | Silver Medalists | 3rd | Score | 4th place |
Final Four
| 1999 | Balkan Hall, Botevgrad | Cherno More | | Fikosota Shumen | Levski | 91-64 | Yambolgas |
| 2000 | Stroitel Hall, Plovdiv | Cherno More | 84-74 | Levski | Yambolgas | 68-57 | Spartak Pleven |
| 2001 | Balkanstroy Hall, Pleven | Levski | 92-70 | Cherno More | Yambolgas | 90-72 | CSKA |
| 2002 | PCS "Vasil Levski", Veliko Turnovo | Lukoil Academic | 97-84 | Levski | Yambolgas | 84-80 | CSKA |
| 2003 | Sports Hall "Dan Kolov", Sevlievo | Lukoil Academic | 98-73 | Cherno More | Levski | 98-86 | Yambolgas |
| 2004 | Vasil Levski Hall, Pazardzhik | Lukoil Academic | 89-74 | CSKA | Levski | 72-64 | Spartak MVR |
| 2005 | Municipal Hall, Stara Zagora | CSKA | 86-80 | Lukoil Academic | Cherno More | 107-75 | Spartak Pleven |
| 2006 | Dunav Hall, Ruse | Lukoil Academic | 86-81 | Cherno More | Spartak Pleven | 61-57 | Yambol |
| 2007 | Boris Gyuderov Hall, Pernik | Lukoil Academic | 85-75 | Levski | CSKA | 91-88 | Spartak Pleven |
| 2008 | Arena Samokov, Samokov | Lukoil Academic | 102-83 | Cherno More | Levski | 78-77 | CSKA |
Final Eight
| 2009 | Balkanstroy Hall, Pleven | Levski | 89-81 | Lukoil Academic | Spartak Pleven | 85-73 | Rilski Sportist |
| 2010 | Diana Hall, Yambol | Levski | 81-78 | Rilski Sportist | Cherno More | 90-88 | Balkan Botevgrad |
| 2011 | Universiada Hall, Sofia | Lukoil Academic | 81-80 | Levski | Rilski Sportist | 83-75 | Yambol |
| 2012 | Arena Samokov, Samokov | Lukoil Academic | 83-81 | Levski | Cherno More | 74-70 | Yambol |
| 2013 | Congress Hall (PCS), Varna | Lukoil Academic | 84-73 | Levski | Rilski Sportist | 81-72 | Yambol |
| 2014 | Universiada Hall, Sofia | Levski | 100-97 | Cherno More | Rilski Sportist | 81-72 | Balkan Botevgrad |
| 2015 | Balkanstroy Hall, Pleven | Cherno More Port Varna | 96-90 | Lukoil Academic | Rilski Sportist | 74-69 | Yambol |
| 2016 | Arena Botevgrad, Botevgrad | Rilski Sportist | 90-80 | Lukoil Academic | Beroe | 71-59 | Balkan Botevgrad |
| 2017 | Kolodruma Hall, Plovdiv | Beroe | 78-62 | Lukoil Academic | Balkan Botevgrad | 83-62 | Academic Bultex 99 |
Final after Two-legged games
| 2017-18 | PCS "Vasil Levski", Veliko Turnovo | Rilski Sportist | 89-80 | Levski Lukoil | Academic Bultex 99 and Balkan Botevgrad | | |
| 2018-19 | Arena Asarel, Panagyurishte | Levski Lukoil | 70-61 | Beroe | Academic Bultex 99 and PBC Academic | | |
Final Eight
| 2020 | Universiada Hall, Sofia | Levski Lukoil | 86-78 | Balkan Botevgrad | Beroe and Rilski Sportist | | |
| 2021 | Arena Asarel, Panagyurishte | Rilski Sportist | 87-69 | Levski Lukoil | Yambol and Balkan Botevgrad | | |
| 2022 | Arena Botevgrad, Botevgrad | Rilski Sportist | 92–86 | Levski Lukoil | Beroe and Balkan Botevgrad | | |
| 2023 | Arena Sofia, Sofia | Levski | 86-81 | CSKA | Chernomorets and Balkan Botevgrad | | |
| 2024 | Arena Burgas, Burgas | Chernomorets | 86-62 | Spartak Pleven | Rilski Sportist and Balkan Botevgrad | | |
| 2025 | Arena Samelyon, Samokov | Cherno More Ticha | 89-81 | Balkan Botevgrad | Rilski Sportist and Spartak Pleven | | |
| 2026 | Arena Botevgrad, Botevgrad | Cherno More Ticha | 88-87 | Lokomotiv Plovdiv | Rilski Sportist and Balkan Botevgrad | | |

== Titles by team ==
| Team | Winners | Winning years |
|---|---|---|
| CSKA Sofia | 17 | 1953, 1955, 1962, 1963, 1973, 1974, 1977, 1978, 1981, 1984, 1985, 1989, 1990, 1991, 1992, 1994, 2005 |
| Levski Sofia | 16 | 1969, 1971, 1972, 1976, 1979, 1980, 1982, 1983, 1993, 2001, 2009, 2010, 2014, 2019, 2020, 2023 |
| Academic Sofia | 11 | 1952, 1954, 2002, 2003, 2004, 2006, 2007, 2008, 2011, 2012, 2013 |
| Cherno More Ticha | 6 | 1998, 1999, 2000, 2015, 2025, 2026 |
| Balkan Botevgrad | 4 | 1970, 1986, 1987, 1988 |
| Rilski Sportist | 4 | 2016, 2018, 2021, 2022 |
| Spartak Sofia | 3 | 1951, 1967, 1968 |
| Chernomorets | 3 | 1965, 1975, 2024 |
| Lokomotiv Sofia | 2 | 1956, 1966 |
| Slavia Sofia | 2 | 1959, 1997 |
| NSA | 1 | 1964 |
| Kompact Dimitrovgrad | 1 | 1995 |
| Spartak Pleven | 1 | 1996 |
| Beroe | 1 | 2017 |
