= BC Polytechnica Dupnitsa =

BC Polytechnica
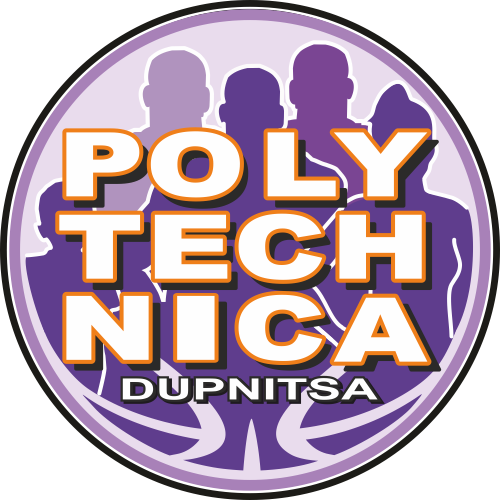
- League: NBL
- Founded: 1996; 30 years ago
- Arena: Dupnitsa Sports Hall
- Capacity: 1505
- Location: Dupnitsa, Bulgaria
- Team colours: Purple, White
- President: Zlatan Atanasov
- Team manager: Aleksnadar Dragievic
- Website: plth.net

Polytechica Dupnitsa (Bulgarian: Политехника Дупница) is a basketball club based in Dupnitsa, Bulgaria. The club was originaly founded in 1996 as sports team for the University of Architecture, Civil Engineering and Geodesy in Sofia. In the 2026-27 NBL season Polytechnica will make their debut in the top flight of Bulgarian basketball. Their home arena is the Sports Hall Dupnitsa which has a capacity of 1505 seats.

== History ==
BC Polytechnica were founded in 1996 as an extension sports team for the University of Architecture, Civil Engineering and Geodesy until 2002. Since 2002 the club has always participated in basketball tournaments in Bulgaria. In 2016 the club was registered as an official basketball club to the Bulgarian Basketball Federation. Polytechnica joined the BBL A Group for the 2020-21 season finishing 13th in their first season. In 2023 the club moved their headquarters from Sofia to Dupnitsa. Then the club started playing in the Dupnitsa Sports Hall. In the 2023-24 season Polytecnica had their best season finishing 4th. In the 2024-25 season they finished 1st in the regular season, but finished 3rd in the playoffs. In the 2025-26 season they finished 3rd in the regular season. In the 2026-27 season Polytechnica will debut in the National Basketball League.
