= Stanislav Tsonkov =

Bulgarian basketball player

New Basket Agropoli
- Position: Guard
- League: Serie C Gold Basket

Personal information
- Born: September 16, 1991 (age 35) Varna, Bulgaria
- Listed height: 1.92 m (6 ft 4 in)
- Listed weight: 87 kg (192 lb)

Career information
- Playing career: 2011–present

Career history
- 2011–2017: Cherno More
- 2017: AV Ohrid
- 2017–2018: Beroe
- 2018–present: New Basket Agropoli

Stanislav Tsonkov (Bulgarian: Станислав Цонков) (born September 16, 1991) is a Bulgarian professional basketball guard who currently plays for New Basket Agropoli.
