= Arena Samokov =

Sports venue in Samokov, Bulgaria

- Interactive map of Arena Samokov
- Location: Samokov, Bulgaria
- Coordinates: 42°19′56″N 23°33′18″E
- Capacity: 2,000

Construction
- Built: 2007; 19 years ago
- Opened: March 8, 2008; 18 years ago
- Cost: 16 million BGN (approx. 8.2 million EUR)

Tenant
- BC Rilski Sportist

Arena Samokov (Bulgarian: Арена Самоков) is a multifunctional Indoor arena located in Samokov, Bulgaria. The arena finished construction in 2007 and opened on March 8, 2008. It has a seating capacity of 2,000 people, expandable to 2,300, and a VIP area with a capacity for 46 people. BC Rilski Sportist of the NBL play their home games in the arena. It supports up to 26 different sports, including basketball, volleyball, handball, futsal, among others.

The arena was host to the Bulgarian Basketball Cup in 2008 and 2012.

== See also ==
- List of indoor arenas in Bulgaria
