= BC Botev Vratsa =

Bulgarian basketball club

Botev Vratsa
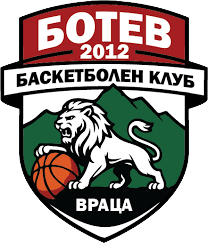
- Leagues: NBL
- Founded: 2012
- Arena: Arena Botevgrad
- Capacity: 3,200
- Location: Botevgrad, Bulgaria
- Team colors: Green, White
- President: Hristo Tsvetkov
- Head coach: Miroslav Ralchev
- Website: bbotev2012.com
| Home | Away |

Botev 2012 Vratsa (Bulgarian: Ботев 2012 Враца) is a Bulgarian professional basketball club based in Vratsa. They play their home matches at the Arena Botevgrad.

== History ==
The club was created in 2012 building their youth formation. Botev entered BBL, the second tier of Bulgarian basketball, for the 2023-24 season. The club was promoted to Bulgarian Championship for the 25-26 season. Botev is a joint project between Municipal Vratsa and Municipal Botevgrad. For their first season, most of the player would be loaned from Balkan Botevgrad. They will play in their home games in Botevgrad, until the construction of the new Arena Vratsa hall is completed.
