= BC Lokomotiv Plovdiv =

Bulgarian basketball club

Lokomotiv Plovdiv
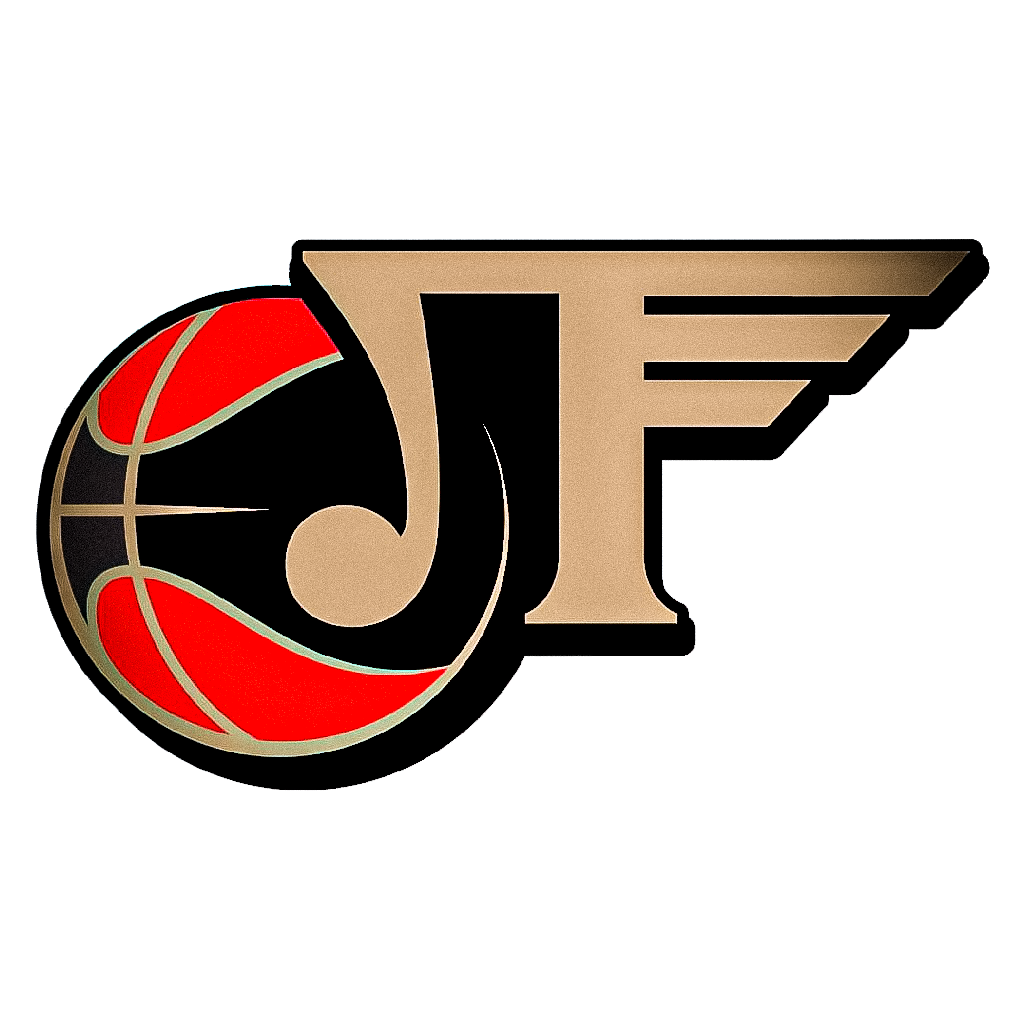
- Leagues: NBL; Europe Cup
- Founded: 1926
- Arena: SILA Hall
- Capacity: 1,600
- Location: Plovdiv, Bulgaria
- Team colors: White and Black
- President: Hristo Hristev
- Head coach: Asen Nikolov
- Website: lokoplovdiv-bc.com
Home	Away

BC Lokomotiv Plovdiv (Bulgarian: БК „Локомотив Пловдив“) is a Bulgarian professional basketball club based in Plovdiv. The team plays its home games at the Arena SILA..

== History ==
Created as part of Lokomotiv sports club in the thirties, the club was playing in Bulgarian Championship from 1958 to 1964, after which it ceased participation in the men's division. The club was restored in may of 2022. Lokomotiv returned to the top tier for the 2025–26 season, ending nearly 60 years of absence. In the same season, they grabbed the silver medal in the Cup, losing to Cherno More Ticha 87–88. On 5 June 2026 Lokomotiv lost the NBL playoff series 3-2 against Balkan Botevgrad, losing the last match 80–81. In the 2026–27 season Lokomotiv will debut in european competitions, featuring in the 2026–27 FIBA Europe Cup.

== Honours ==
- National Basketball League
  - Runners-up (1): 2026
- Bulgarian Cup
  - Runners-up (1): 2026
