= Minyor 2015 =

Bulgarian basketball club

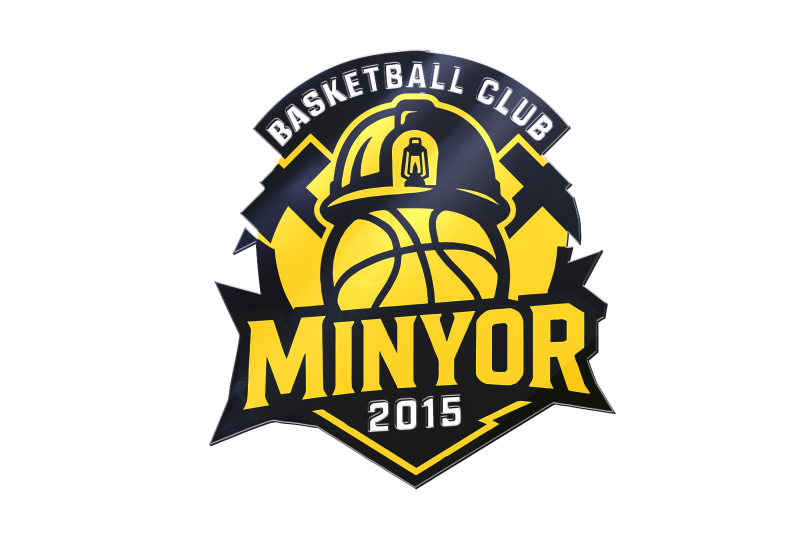
- Nickname: "Miners"
- Leagues: NBL
- Founded: 2015
- Arena: Boris Gyuderov Hall
- Capacity: 1,700
- Location: Pernik, Bulgaria
- Team colors: Yellow and Blue
- President: Nikolay Goranov
- Head coach: Milen Dudev
- Website: bkminyor2015.com
Home	Away

Minyor 2015 (Bulgarian: Миньор 2015) is a Bulgarian professional basketball club based in Pernik. The team plays its home games at Boris Gyuderov Hall.

== History ==
The club was created in 2015 building their youth formation. Minyor entered BBL, the second tier of Bulgarian basketball, for the 2021-22 season. The club was promoted to Bulgarian Championship for the 23-24 season.
