= BC Spartak Pleven =

Bulgarian basketball club

Spartak Pleven
- Leagues: NBL
- Founded: 1947; 79 years ago
- Arena: Balkanstroy Hall
- Capacity: 1,500
- Location: Pleven, Bulgaria
- President: Tsvetan Antov
- Championships: 2 Bulgarian Championships; 1 Bulgarian Cup
Home	Away

BC Spartak Pleven (Bulgarian: БК „Спартак Плевен“) are a Bulgarian professional basketball club based in Pleven.

== History ==
Founded in 1947, Spartak has been 2 time champions of Bulgaria, and 1 time Bulgarian Cup winners. They play their home matches at the Balkanstroy Hall. The team is a regular first league participant. Spartak Pleven has 13 seasons in the European club competitions since their international promotion in 1983. The club from the Northern Bulgarian city of Pleven has victories over basketball giants like Real Madrid, Partizan Belgrade, Besiktas, Benfica, etc.

Spartak Pleven was eliminated by Turkish side Antalya BB in their 2008–09 FIBA EuroChallenge campaign.

== Honours ==
- Bulgarian Championship
  - Winners:(2) 1995, 1996
  - Runners-up: 1989
  - Bronze medalist: 1983, 1987, 1992, 1994
- Bulgarian Cup
  - Winners: (1) 1996
  - Runners-up: 1994, 1995, 2024
  - Bronze medalist: 2006, 2009
- Bulgarian Super Cup
  - Runners-up (1): 2024

== Season by season ==
Season	Tier	Division	Pos.	Bulgarian Cup	European competitions		
2020–21	1	NBL	8th	Quarterfinalist			
2021–22	1	NBL	4th	Quarterfinalist			
2022–23	1	NBL	5th	Quarterfinalist			
2023–24	1	NBL	4th	Runner-up	R European North Basketball League	RS	1-6
2024–25	1	NBL	4th	Semifinalist	R European North Basketball League	RS	1-7
2025–26	1	NBL	6th	Quarterfinalist	R European North Basketball League	RS	3-5
2026–27	1	NBL	TBD	TBD	R European North Basketball League	RS	0-0
