= National Basketball League (Bulgaria) =

- Founded: 1942
- First season: 1942–43
- Country: Bulgaria
- Confederation: FIBA Europe
- Number of teams: 14
- Level on pyramid: 1
- Domestic cup: Bulgarian Cup
- Supercup: Super Cup
- International cup(s): Basketball Champions League; FIBA Europe Cup
- Current champions: Balkan Botevgrad (8th title) (2025–26)
- Most championships: Academic Sofia (26 titles)
- TV partners: Max Sport
- Website: nbl.basketball.bg
- 2026–27 NBL Season

The National Basketball League (NBL) (in Bulgarian: Националната баскетболна лига) is the highest-level professional basketball league in Bulgaria. The current league was founded in 2008, though the first-tier level existed since 1942 and was previously called the Bulgarian A Division. The games in the NBL are played under FIBA rules.

The most successful team in NBL history is PBC Academic, which has won 26 national titles.

== Current teams ==
| Club | Last season | Arena | Location | Capacity |
|---|---|---|---|---|
| Balkan Botevgrad | 1st | Arena Botevgrad | Botevgrad | 4,500 |
| Beroe | 8th | Municipal Hall | Stara Zagora | 800 |
| Botev Academic | 9th | SILA Hall | Plovdiv | 1,600 |
| Botev Vratsa | 5th | Arena Botevgrad | Botevgrad | 4,500 |
| Cherno More Ticha | 4th | Hristo Borisov Hall | Varna | 800 |
| Cherno More Ticha | 4th | Kongresna Hall | Varna | 5,116 |
| CSKA Sofia | N/A | CSKA | Sofia | 450 |
| Minyor 2015 | 7th | Boris Gyuderov Hall | Pernik | 1,700 |
| Levski | 10th | Triaditsa Hall | Sofia | 530 |
| Lokomotiv Plovdiv | 2nd | SILA Hall | Plovdiv | 1,600 |
| Polytechnica | N/A | Dupnitsa Sports Hall | Dupnitsa | 1,505 |
| Rilski Sportist | 3rd | Arena Samelyon | Samokov | 3,000 |
| Rilski Sportist | 3rd | Arena Samokov | Samokov | 2,500 |
| Shumen | 11th | Arena Shumen | Shumen | 1,500 |
| Spartak Pleven | 6th | Balkanstroy Hall | Pleven | 1,000 |
| Yambol | N/A | Diana | Yambol | 1,800 |

== Title holders ==
- 1942 Levski Sofia
- 1943 JSK Sofia
- 1945 PSK Levski '45
- 1946 PSK Levski '45
- 1947 PSK Levski '45
- 1947–48 Lokomotiv Sofia
- 1948–49 CDNV Sofia
- 1949–50 Narodna voiska Sofia
- 1950–51 CDNV Sofia
- 1951–52 Udarnik Sofia
- 1952–53 Udarnik Sofia
- 1953–54 Spartak Sofia
- 1954–55 Lokomotiv Sofia
- 1955–56 Spartak Sofia
- 1956–57 Academic
- 1957–58 Academic
- 1958–59 Academic
- 1959–60 Spartak Sofia
- 1960–61 Lokomotiv Sofia
- 1961–62 Spartak Sofia
- 1962–63 Academic
- 1963–64 Lokomotiv Sofia
- 1964–65 CSKA Cherveno zname
- 1965–66 Lokomotiv Sofia
- 1966–67 CSKA Cherveno zname
- 1967–68 Academic
- 1968–69 Academic
- 1969–70 Academic
- 1970–71 Academic
- 1971–72 Academic
- 1972–73 Academic
- 1973–74 Balkan Botevgrad
- 1974–75 Academic
- 1975–76 Academic
- 1976–77 CSKA Septemvriisko zname
- 1977–78 Levski-Spartak
- 1978–79 Levski-Spartak
- 1979–80 CSKA Sofia
- 1980–81 Levski-Spartak
- 1981–82 Levski-Spartak
- 1982–83 CSKA Sofia
- 1983–84 CSKA Sofia
- 1984–85 Akademik Varna
- 1985–86 Levski-Spartak
- 1986–87 Balkan Botevgrad
- 1987–88 Balkan Botevgrad
- 1988–89 Balkan Botevgrad
- 1989–90 CSKA Sofia
- 1990–91 CSKA Sofia
- 1991–92 CSKA Sofia
- 1992–93 Levski Sofia
- 1993–94 Levski Sofia
- 1994–95 Spartak Pleven
- 1995–96 Spartak Pleven
- 1996–97 Slavia Sofia
- 1997–98 Cherno More Varna
- 1998–99 Cherno More Varna
- 1999–00 Levski Sofia
- 2000–01 Levski Sofia
- 2001–02 Yambolgas
- 2002–03 Lukoil Academic
- 2003–04 Lukoil Academic
- 2004–05 Lukoil Academic
- 2005–06 Lukoil Academic
- 2006–07 Lukoil Academic
- 2007–08 Lukoil Academic
- 2008–09 Lukoil Academic
- 2009–10 Lukoil Academic
- 2010–11 Lukoil Academic
- 2011–12 Lukoil Academic
- 2012–13 Lukoil Academic
- 2013–14 Levski Sofia
- 2014–15 Lukoil Academic
- 2015–16 Lukoil Academic
- 2016–17 Lukoil Academic
- 2017–18 Levski Sofia
- 2018–19 Balkan Botevgrad
- 2019–20 Abandoned due to the COVID-19 pandemic in Bulgaria
- 2020–21 Levski-Lukoil Sofia
- 2021–22 Balkan Botevgrad
- 2022–23 Balkan Botevgrad
- 2023–24 Rilski Sportist
- 2024–25 Rilski Sportist
- 2025–26 Balkan Botevgrad

== Titles by club ==
| Club | Winners | Runners-up | Winning years |
|---|---|---|---|
| Academic Sofia | 26 | 10 | 1957, 1958, 1959, 1963, 1968, 1969, 1970, 1971, 1972, 1973, 1975, 1976, 2003, 2004, 2005, 2006, 2007, 2008, 2009, 2010, 2011, 2012, 2013, 2015, 2016, 2017 |
| Levski Sofia | 16 | 21 | 1942, 1945, 1946, 1947, 1978, 1979, 1981, 1982, 1986, 1993, 1994, 2000, 2001, 2014, 2018, 2021 |
| CSKA Sofia | 12 | 15 | 1949, 1950, 1951, 1965, 1967, 1977, 1980, 1983, 1984, 1990, 1991, 1992 |
| Balkan Botevgrad | 8 | 6 | 1974, 1987, 1988, 1989, 2019, 2022, 2023, 2026 |
| Lokomotiv Sofia | 6 | 5 | 1943, 1948, 1955, 1961, 1964, 1966 |
| Spartak Sofia | 4 | 2 | 1954, 1956, 1960, 1962 |
| Slavia Sofia | 3 | 4 | 1952, 1953, 1997 |
| Cherno More Port Varna | 3 | 8 | 1985, 1998, 1999 |
| Rilski Sportist | 2 | 2 | 2024, 2025 |
| Spartak Pleven | 2 | 1 | 1995, 1996 |
| Yambol | 1 | 1 | 2002 |

== Latest finals ==
| Season | Champions | Score | Runners-Up |
|---|---|---|---|
| 2000–01 | Levski | 3–0 | Yambol |
| 2001–02 | Yambol | 3–0 | Lukoil Academic |
| 2002–03 | Lukoil Academic | 3–0 | Levski |
| 2003–04 | Lukoil Academic | 3–0 | CSKA |
| 2004–05 | Lukoil Academic | 3–0 | CSKA |
| 2005–06 | Lukoil Academic | 3–0 | Cherno More |
| 2006–07 | Lukoil Academic | 3–0 | CSKA |
| 2007–08 | Lukoil Academic | 3–0 | Balkan |
| 2008–09 | Lukoil Academic | 3–1 | Cherno More |
| 2009–10 | Lukoil Academic | 3–1 | Levski |
| 2010–11 | Lukoil Academic | 3–0 | Levski |
| 2011–12 | Lukoil Academic | 3–0 | Levski |
| 2012–13 | Lukoil Academic | 3–2 | Levski |
| 2013–14 | Levski | 3–2 | Lukoil Academic |
| 2014–15 | Lukoil Academic | 3–2 | Balkan |
| 2015–16 | Lukoil Academic | 3–0 | Balkan |
| 2016–17 | Lukoil Academic | 3–1 | Beroe |
| 2017–18 | Levski | 3–1 | Balkan |
| 2018–19 | Balkan | 3–1 | Levski |
| 2020–21 | Levski | 4–1 | Rilski Sportist |
| 2021–22 | Balkan | 3–1 | Rilski Sportist |
| 2022–23 | Balkan | 3–0 | Chernomorets |
| 2023–24 | Rilski Sportist | 3–1 | Balkan |
| 2024–25 | Rilski Sportist | 3–1 | Cherno More |
| 2025–26 | Balkan | 3–2 | Lokomotiv Plovdiv |

== See also ==
- Bulgarian Basketball All-Star Game
