= BC Beroe =

Beroe
- Nickname: Зелените (The Greens)
- Leagues: NBL; BIBL
- Founded: 1958; 67 years ago
- History: BC Beroe (1958–present)
- Arena: Obshtinska Municipal Hall
- Capacity: 800
- Location: Stara Zagora, Bulgaria
- Team colors: White and Green
- President: Vasil Kifev
- Head coach: Lyubomir Minchev
- Championships: 1 Bulgarian Cup; 1 Bulgarian Super Cups; 1 BIBL
- Website: http://beroebasket.com/
Home	Away

BC Beroe (Bulgarian: БК Берое) is a Bulgarian professional basketball club based in Stara Zagora and plays in the Bulgarian National Basketball League. The club plays its home games at the Obshtinska Municipal Hall, which has a capacity of 800 spectators. In 2012, the team promoted to the NBL.

In European competition, Beroe has participated in the FIBA Europe Cup and the Balkan International Basketball League. They are 1 time finalist in Bulgarian league (2017), 1 time Bulgarian Cup winner (2017), 1 time Balkan League winner (2017).

Beroe's team colors are green and white, and their mascot is a bear named Bero.

== History ==
Former logo of the club

Beroe was founded in 1958 after the union between Botev and Lokomotiv sport clubs. After a period of several years in the Group B Beroe won back his place in the elite echelon - Group A 1971. In 2004, Beroe occupied ninth place in the league of the country with coach Konstantin Boev.

== Honours ==
- Bulgarian Cup
  - Champions (1): 2017
- Bulgarian Basketball Super Cup
  - Champions (1): 2017
- BIBL
  - Champions (1): 2017

Division A (II tier):

- Champions (1): 2012
- Runners-up (2): 2011, 2010

Cup of BFB (II tier):

- Winners (1): 2012

== Season by season ==
Season	Tier	League	Pos.	Bulgarian Cup	Other leagues		European competitions	
2002–03	2	Pro B	5th					
2003–04	2	A2 East	1st					
2004–05	2	A2 East	4th					
2005–06	2	A2 East	2nd					
2006–07	2	A2 East	1st					
2007–08	3	D3	1st					
2008–09	2	Division A	8th					
2009–10	2	Division A	2nd		BFB Cup	4th		
2010–11	2	Division A	2nd		BFB Cup	4th		
2011–12	2	Division A	1st		BFB Cup	C		
2012–13	1	NBL	7th					
2013–14	1	NBL	9th					
2014–15	1	NBL	6th	Quarterfinalist				
2015–16	1	NBL	5th	Third place	Balkan League	SF		
2016–17	1	NBL	2nd	Champions	Balkan League	C		
2017–18	1	NBL					4 FIBA Europe Cup	QR2

== Current roster ==
Note: Flags indicate national team eligibility at FIBA-sanctioned events. Players may hold other non-FIBA nationalities not displayed.

BC Beroe roster
Players
Coaches

Pos.	No.	Nat.	Name	Ht.	Wt.	Age
G	1	(United States)	Whisnant, Terry	1.90 m (6 ft 3 in)	84 kg (185 lb)	32 – 5 November 1992
F	5	(United States)	Davis, Alex	2.06 m (6 ft 9 in)	95 kg (209 lb)	33 – 28 January 1992
SG	8	(Bulgaria)	Nikolov, Nikolay	1.96 m (6 ft 5 in)	90 kg (198 lb)	31 – 24 March 1994
PG	9	(United States)	DiNunno, Mike	1.80 m (5 ft 11 in)	87 kg (192 lb)	35 – 20 January 1990
PF	12	(Bulgaria)	Yanev, Aleksandar	2.03 m (6 ft 8 in)	104 kg (229 lb)	35 – 20 January 1990
PF	15	(Bulgaria)	Todorov, Todor	2.00 m (6 ft 7 in)	109 kg (240 lb)	43 – 19 May 1982
PF	20	(United States)	Kemp, Adam	2.08 m (6 ft 10 in)	107 kg (236 lb)	34 – 20 December 1990
PG	23	(United States)	Parker, Adonte	1.86 m (6 ft 1 in)		35 – 23 June 1989
SG	24	(Bulgaria)	Zhelev, Tihomir	1.93 m (6 ft 4 in)	88 kg (194 lb)	34 – 24 September 1990
PG	30	(Bulgaria)	Dudev, Milen	1.78 m (5 ft 10 in)	75 kg (165 lb)	30 – 28 November 1994
PG	33	(United States)	Frankamp, Conner	1.85 m (6 ft 1 in)	77 kg (170 lb)	29 – 16 July 1995
G	45	(Bulgaria)	Tsonkov, Stanislav	1.92 m (6 ft 4 in)	85 kg (187 lb)	33 – 16 September 1991

Head coach

- (Bulgaria) Lyubomir Minchev

Assistant coach(es)

- (Bulgaria) Boyko Milenkov

Physiotherapist(s)

- (Bulgaria) Dinko Neykov

Team manager

- (Bulgaria) Atanas Radev

Legend

- (C) Team captain
- Injured

- Roster
Updated: 2017-01-23

=== Notable former players ===
- Austin Price (born 1995), American

== Head coaches ==
- (Bulgaria) Lubomir Minchev
