= Max Sport =

- Type: Private
- Country: Bulgaria
- Broadcast area: Bulgaria
- Headquarters: Sofia, Bulgaria

Programming
- Language: Bulgarian
- Picture format: 1080i HDTV

Ownership
- Owner: A1 Bulgaria

History
- Launched: 14 January 2017
- Former names: Mtel Sport

Links
- Website: maxsport.live

Max Sport (formerly known as "Mtel Sport") are group of Bulgarian paid television channels, owned by A1 Bulgaria. The two channels from the group, along with the sports channel EDGEsport, owned by IMG Media, forms the paid "Max Sport" pack, which is offered exclusively for A1 and blizoo television customers.

== History ==
The first channel from the group – Max Sport 1, was launched on 14 January 2017, while the second one – Max Sport 2 was launched on 1 March 2017. The channels airs sports events such as football from the Italian Serie A, Spanish La Liga, Dutch Eredivisie, Russian Premier League, Ukrainian Premier League and the Chinese Super League, Basketball from EuroLeague, Volleyball, the ATP World Tour, athletics from IAAF Diamond League, NHL, NFL, MotoGP, NASCAR, the FIA World Rallycross Championship, UFC, boxing and others.

In October 2018, Max Sport 3 was created with new content on board - UEFA Champions League and the Spanish La Liga. In the middle of January 2019 A1 launched Max Sport 4 with more football content - Copa Libertadores, MLS, Cup of France, Cup of Turkey.

After Mtel was rebranded to A1 Bulgaria in May 2018, Mtel Sport became Max Sport.
