= Arena Botevgrad =

Indoor arena in Botevgrad, Bulgaria

- Arena Botevgrad in June 2014
- Interactive map of Arena Botevgrad
- Location: 9 Zahari Stoyanov Street; 2140 Botevgrad, Bulgaria
- Coordinates: 42.900026°N 23.788394°E
- Owner: Municipality of Botevgrad
- Capacity: Sports: 3,200
- Surface: Versatile
- Field size: 24/44 m

Construction
- Groundbreaking: 2012; 14 years ago
- Opened: March 29, 2014; 12 years ago
- Cost: 7.02 million BGN (around 3.5 million EUR)
- Architects: Bozhidar Hinkov; Borislav Bogdanov
- Main contractor: R.S. Engineering

Tenants
- BC Balkan Botevgrad (2014–present); Bulgaria men's national basketball team Hapoel Tel Aviv B.C. (temporary)

Arena Botevgrad (Bulgarian: Арена Ботевград) is an indoor arena located in Botevgrad, Bulgaria. It has a capacity of 4,500, and has been the home venue for BC Balkan Botevgrad since its opening in 2014.

== History ==
Arena Botevgrad was officially opened on March 29, 2014 after two years of construction in the presence of Bulgarian Prime Minister Boyko Borisov, Botevgrad's mayor Georgi Georgiev, and several government ministers. The hall cost 7.02 million Bulgarian lev, or about 3.5 million Euros to build.

Between February 18th and 21st, 2016, the hall was host to the 2016 Bulgarian Basketball Cup Final 8 bracket, with BC Rilski Sportist claiming their first ever cup. In September 2016, Arena Botevgrad hosted the national basketball team's home games from Group E of the EuroBasket 2017 qualification.

Hapoel Tel Aviv B.C. also used as a temporary arena for EuroCup (2023–2025) and EuroLeague (2025–present) due to Gaza war and most recently, Iran war.

== See also ==
- List of indoor arenas in Bulgaria
