= BC Rilski Sportist =

Bulgarian basketball club

- Leagues: NBL; Europe Cup
- Founded: 1927; 99 years ago
- Arena: Arena Samelyon
- Capacity: 3,000
- Location: Samokov, Bulgaria
- President: Petar Georgiev
- Head coach: Lyubomir Kirov
- Championships: 2 Bulgarian League; 4 Bulgarian Cup; 1 Balkan League; 3 Bulgarian Basketball Super Cup
- Website: www.rilskibasket.com
Home	Away

BC Rilski Sportist (Bulgarian: БК "Рилски Спортист") is a Bulgarian professional basketball club based in Samokov. The team is part of NBL, FIBA Europe Cup, and BIBL. They play their home matches at the Arena Samokov, which has a capacity of 3,000 people.

== Honours ==
- National Basketball League

Winners (2): 2024, 2025
Runners-up (2) 2021, 2022

- Bulgarian Cup

Winners (4): 2016, 2018, 2021, 2022
Runners-up (1): 2010

- Balkan League

Winners (1): 2009
Runners-up (2): 2011, 2015

- Bulgarian Basketball Super Cup

Winners (3): 2021, 2022, 2024
Runners-up (2): 2016, 2025

== Season by season ==
Season	Tier	League	Pos.	Bulgarian Cup	Other leagues		European competitions	
2013–14	1	NBL	6th	Semifinalist			3 EuroChallenge	RS
2014–15	1	NBL	4th	Third place	Balkan League	RU		
2015–16	1	NBL	3rd	Champion			3 FIBA Europe Cup	RS
2016–17	1	NBL	3rd	Quarterfinalist			4 FIBA Europe Cup	RS
2017–18	1	NBL	3rd	Champion	Balkan League	3rd	4 FIBA Europe Cup	QR1
2018–19	1	NBL	4th	Quarterfinalist			4 FIBA Europe Cup	RS
2019–20	1	NBL	3rd (Note: On 13 March 2020, the Bulgarian government halted the league until 13 April 2020, due to the COVID-19 pandemic. On 16 April 2020, after a month of suspension, the Bulgarian Basketball Federation officially ended the 2019–20 season, after video conference vote of board of directors. Balkan ended the season first, with eighteen wins, but the title was not assigned.)	Quarterfinalist				
2020–21	1	NBL	2nd	Champion			4 FIBA Europe Cup	R16
2021–22	1	NBL	2nd	Champion			4 FIBA Europe Cup	RS
2022–23	1	NBL	4th	Quarterfinalist	Balkan League	1R	4 FIBA Europe Cup	RS
2023–24	1	NBL	1st	Semifinalist				
2024–25	1	NBL	1st	Semifinalist			4 FIBA Europe Cup	RS
2025–26	1	NBL		Semifinalist			3 Champions League	QR1
2025–26	1	NBL		Semifinalist			4 FIBA Europe Cup	RS

== Players ==
=== Notable players ===
Note: Flags indicate national team eligibility at FIBA-sanctioned events. Players may hold other non-FIBA nationalities not displayed.

Criteria

To appear in this section a player must have either:

- Set a club record or won an individual award while at the club
- Played at least one official international match for their national team at any time
- Played at least one official NBA match at any time.

- (Serbia) Branko Mirković (2007-2009)
- (Bosnia and Herzegovina) Aleksandar Radojević (1 year: 2011)
- (Chile) Nico Carvacho (1 season: 2020–21)

== Head coaches ==
- (North Macedonia) Aleksandar Todorov (2008–2011)
- (Bulgaria) Rosen Barchovski (2011–2016)
- (Bulgaria) Ludmil Hadjisotirov (2016–present)
