= BC Balkan Botevgrad =

Balkan Botevgrad
- Nickname: Зелените (The Greens)
- Leagues: NBL; EuroCup
- Founded: 1947; 79 years ago
- History: BC Balkan Botevgrad (1947–present)
- Arena: Arena Botevgrad
- Capacity: 3,200
- Location: Botevgrad, Bulgaria
- Team colors: Green, White
- President: Mihail Mihaylov
- General manager: Sasho Vezenkov
- Head coach: Bogdan Karaičić
- Championships: 8 Bulgarian Leagues; 4 Bulgarian Cups; 1 Bulgarian Super Cup
- Website: balkan-basket.com
Home	Away	Third

BC Balkan Botevgrad (Bulgarian: БК Балкан Ботевград, romanized: BK Balkan Botevgrad) is a Bulgarian professional basketball club based in Botevgrad. The team competes in the NBL and in the EuroCup. They play their home matches at the Arena Botevgrad.

== Honours ==
- National Basketball League
  - Winners (8): 1974, 1987, 1988, 1989, 2019, 2022, 2023, 2026
  - Runners-up (6): 1972, 2008, 2015, 2016, 2018, 2024
- Bulgarian Cup
  - Winners: (4) 1970, 1986, 1987, 1988
  - Runners-up (2): 2020, 2025
- Bulgarian Super Cup
  - Winners: (1) 2026
  - Runners-up (3): 2019, 2022, 2023
- Balkan League
  - Third place (1): 2014

== Season by season ==
Season	Tier	League	Pos.	Bulgarian Cup	Other leagues		European competitions	
2012–13	1	NBL	3rd	Quarterfinalist				
2013–14	1	NBL	3rd	Semifinalist	Balkan League	3rd		
2014–15	1	NBL	2nd	Quarterfinalist				
2015–16	1	NBL	2nd	Semifinalist				
2016–17	1	NBL	6th	Third Place				
2017–18	1	NBL	2nd	Semifinalist			4 FIBA Europe Cup	RS
2018–19	1	NBL	1st	Quarterfinalists			4 FIBA Europe Cup	Top 16
2019–20	1	NBL	–	Runner-up			4 FIBA Europe Cup	RS
2020–21	1	NBL	4th	Semifinalist			3 Champions League	1QR
2020–21	1	NBL	4th	Semifinalist			4 FIBA Europe Cup	QF
2021–22	1	NBL	1st	Semifinalist	Balkan League	1R		
2022–23	1	NBL	1st	Semifinalist			4 FIBA Europe Cup	RS
2023–24	1	NBL	2nd	Semifinalist			4 FIBA Europe Cup	2R
2024–25	1	NBL	3rd	Runner-up			4 FIBA Europe Cup	RS
2025–26	1	NBL	1st	Semifinalist			4 FIBA Europe Cup	Q

== Players ==
=== Current roster ===
Note: Flags indicate national team eligibility at FIBA-sanctioned events. Players may hold other non-FIBA nationalities not displayed.

Balkan Botevgrad roster
Players
Coaches

Pos.	No.	Nat.	Name	Ht.	Age
PF	0	(Australia)	Okwera, David	2.08 m (6 ft 10 in)	24 – 31 July 2002
PG	1	(United States)	Edge, Darnell	1.85 m (6 ft 1 in)	29 – 12 August 1997
G/F	2	(Mexico)	Bonilla, Gael	2.03 m (6 ft 8 in)	23 – 26 February 2003
SG	3	(Bulgaria)	Stoimenov, Aleksandar	1.98 m (6 ft 6 in)	25 – 26 October 2001
G/F	8	(Australia)	Ducas, Alex	2.01 m (6 ft 7 in)	25 – 11 December 2000
SG	10	(Bulgaria)	Ivanov, Pavlin	1.96 m (6 ft 5 in)	33 – 28 March 1993
G	13	(United States)	McCoy, Javante	1.96 m (6 ft 5 in)	28 – 24 January 1998
C	14	(Cameroon)	Chomche, Ulrich	2.11 m (6 ft 11 in)	20 – 30 December 2005
PG	22	(Bulgaria)	Toshkov, Konstantin	1.83 m (6 ft 0 in)	24 – 14 February 2002
SF	33	(Bulgaria)	Grozev, Nikolay	1.98 m (6 ft 6 in)	32 – 17 February 1994
PF	34	(Bulgaria)	Dimitrov, Dimitar	2.03 m (6 ft 8 in)	33 – 1 March 1993
SF	35	(Bulgaria)	Alipiev, Ivan	2.03 m (6 ft 8 in)	27 – 28 July 1999
C	41	(United States)	Mathon, Sukhmail	2.07 m (6 ft 9 in)	28 – 1 May 1998
F	44	(Bulgaria)	Sotirov, Martin	2.01 m (6 ft 7 in)	27 – 7 November 1999
F	91	(Bulgaria)	Spirov, Ivan	2.02 m (6 ft 8 in)	23 – 10 October 2003

Head coach

- (Serbia) Bogdan Karaičić

Assistant coach(es)

- (Serbia) Jovan Popović

Legend

- (C) Team captain
- Injured

- Roster
Updated: August 24, 2026

=== Depth chart ===
Pos.	Starting 5	Bench 1	Bench 2
C	Ulrich Chomche
PF	David Okwera
SF	Alex Ducas	Gael Bonilla	Dimitar Dimitrov
SG	Javante McCoy	Pavlin Ivanov	Alexander Stoimenov
PG	Darnell Edge

=== Notable players ===
Note: Flags indicate national team eligibility at FIBA-sanctioned events. Players may hold other non-FIBA nationalities not displayed.

Criteria

To appear in this section a player must have either:

- Set a club record or won an individual award while at the club
- Played at least one official international match for their national team at any time
- Played at least one official NBA match at any time.

- (Bulgaria) Ivan Lilov
- (Bulgaria) Stanimir Marinov
- (Bulgaria) Pavel Marinov
- (Bulgaria) Yordan Bozov
- (Bulgaria) Martin Marinov
- (Bulgaria) Dimitar Dimitrov
- (Bulgaria) Kris Minkov
- (Bulgaria) Pavlin Ivanov
- (Bulgaria) Ventsislav Petkov
- (Kosovo) (Montenegro) Amin Hot
- (United States) Noah Dahlman
- (United States) Dwayne Morton
- (United States) Mikael Hopkins
- (United States) Jordan Callahan
- (United States) Brandon Brown
