= 2017–18 Bulgarian Basketball Cup =

Bulgarian Basketball Cup
- Season: 2017–18
- Duration: 22 November 2017 – 3 March 2018
- Games played: 19
- Teams: 14

Regular season
- Season MVP: Yordan Bozov

Finals
- Champions: Rilski Sportist (2nd title)
- Runners-up: Levski Lukoil
- Semi-finalists: Bultex 99; Balkan Botevgrad

Statistical leaders
Points	Luybomir Lilov	27
Rebounds	Aleksandar Yanev	13.5
Assists	Todor Zahariev	7

Records
- Biggest home win: Balkan 94–61 PBC Academic (17 January 2018)
- Biggest away win: PBC Academic 54–83 Balkan (10 January 2018)
- Highest scoring: Rilski Sportist 106–74 Yambol (17 January 2018)

The 2017–18 Bulgarian Basketball Cup was the 64th edition of the annual cup tournament in Bulgaria.It is managed by the Bulgarian Basketball Federation.The competition started on November 22, 2017, and ended with the Final on March 3, 2018. Rilski Sportist won their second cup. Yordan Bozov was named Final MVP.

== Format ==
In this edition, the Bulgarian Basketball Federation presented new format. In the first round, the six teams who participated in European or Regional competitions from the NBL have an automatic bye to the quarterfinals, while the other three teams and five teams from A Group League (second tier) would play a single-game eliminatory for a place in the quarterfinals. Teams with lower league position will have home advantage. The quarterfinals and semifinals are played in a double-legged format.

== Participating clubs ==
2017–18 NBL; 9 clubs	2017–18 Second League; 5 clubs
Bultex 99; Balkan; Beroe; Cherno More; Levski Lukoil; PBC Academic; Rilski Sportist; Spartak Pleven; Yambol	from East zone: Chavdar from West zone: Athletic; Academic Sofia; Vidabasket; BUBA

== Bracket ==
Quarterfinals; 10–17 January
Yambol	77	74	151
Rilski Sportist	83	106	189
Bultex 99	84	81	165
Beroe	78	79	157
Levski Lukoil	83	70	153
Cherno More	63	63	126
Academic	54	61	115
Balkan	83	94	177

Semifinals; 14–17 February
Rilski Sportist	86	83	169
Bultex 99	98	70	168
Levski Lukoil	73	80	153
Balkan	62	87	149

Final; 3 March
Rilski Sportist	89
Levski Lukoil	80

Source: Basketball.bg

== First round ==
The game between Vidabasket and BUBA was canceled, because Vidabasket withdrew the tournament (the club was in the initial draw). That gave an automatic bye to the next round to BUBA.

16 November 2017	Academic Sofia	63–89	Cherno More	Sports Complex Hall, Pravets
19:00(UTC+02)	Scoring by quarter: 15-26, 7-19, 22-19, 19-25
	Pts: Chernokozhev 21; Rebs: Mirchev 7 Asts: Mirchev 6 PIR: Mirchev 20	Boxscore	Pts: Iliev 17; Rebs: Iliev 8 Asts: Bocka, Hristov 6 PIR: Grozev 20

22 November 2017	Chavdar	81–93	Spartak Pleven	Sports Hall Chavdar, Troyan
18:00(UTC+02)	Scoring by quarter: 27-28, 20-16, 20-34, 14-15
	Pts: Lilov 27; Rebs: Raykov 13; Asts: Nakov 6 PIR: Lilov 28	Boxscore	Pts: Ivkov 29; Rebs: Koev 14; Asts: Ivkov, Nikolov, Koev 4 PIR: Ivkov

Canceled	Vidabasket	—–—	BUBA	Festivalna Hall, Vidin

23 November 2017	Athletic	68–90	Yambol	Triaditsa Hall, Sofia
15:00(UTC+02)	Scoring by quarter: 11-28, 22-13, 16-18, 19-31
	Pts: Tanev 24; Rebs: Tanev 9 Asts: Zahariev 7 PIR: Tanev 20	Boxscore	Pts: Govedarov 18; Rebs: Petkov 15; Asts: Govedarov, Cholakov 6 PIR: Petkov 29

== Second round ==
Teams in same division will play in a double-legged format.

27 November 2017	BUBA	56–83	Yambol	Triaditsa Hall, Sofia
16:30(UTC+02)	Scoring by quarter: 22-26, 14-25, 6-14, 14-18
	Pts: Dimitrov 16; Rebs: Marinov, Atanasov 5 Asts: Marinov, Dimitrov 4 PIR: Dimitrov 14	Boxscore	Pts: Arnett 15; Rebs: Ivanov 11; Asts: Govedarov 6 PIR: Arnett 23

27 November 2017	Spartak Pleven	85–88	Cherno More	Balkanstroy Hall, Pleven
19:00(UTC+02)	Scoring by quarter: 16-20, 25-34, 23-9, 21-25
	Pts: Koev 35; Rebs: Bowen, Marinov, Koev 5 Asts: Dudev 8 PIR: Koev 34	Boxscore	Pts: Bocka 23; Rebs: Iliev 8 Asts: Bocka, Ostrev 3 PIR: Bocka 31

6 December 2017	Cherno More	92–74 (Series: Cherno More win 180-159)	Spartak Pleven	Hristo Borisov Hall, Varna
18:00(UTC+02)	Scoring by quarter: 21-17, 23-22, 21-22, 27-13
	Pts: Ostrev 19; Rebs: Tubak 8 Asts: Bocka 7 PIR: Bocka 27	Boxscore	Pts: Nikolov 29; Rebs: Ivkov 6 Asts: Dudev 4 PIR: Nikolov 30

== Quarterfinals ==
10 January 2018	Bultex 99	84–78	Beroe	Arena Sila, Plovdiv
18:00(UTC+02)	Scoring by quarter: 27-20, 16-18, 13-19, 28-21
BNT HD	Pts: Umipig 22; Rebs: Umipig 8 Asts: Durchev 4 PIR: Dimitrov, Umipig 22	Boxscore	Pts: Yanev 19; Rebs: Yanev 11; Asts: Tsonkov 6 PIR: Yanev 25

10 January 2018	PBC Academic	54–83	Balkan Botevgrad	Sports Complex Hall, Pravets
18:00(UTC+02)	Scoring by quarter: 15-24, 15-17, 9-24, 15-18
	Pts: Milov 17; Rebs: Chernokozhev 12; Asts: Alipiev 3 PIR: Alipiev 17	Boxscore	Pts: Kesar 18; Rebs: Kesar 8 Asts: Petkov 5 PIR: Kesar 22

10 January 2018	Yambol	77–83	Rilski Sportist	Diana, Yambol
18:00(UTC+02)	Scoring by quarter: 22-25, 18-16, 23-19, 14-23
	Pts: Govedarov 23; Rebs: Ivanov 11; Asts: Govedarov 5 PIR: Govedarov 25	Boxscore	Pts: Jeter 21; Rebs: Jeter 10; Asts: Wright Jr 9 PIR: Jeter 24

10 January 2018	Levski Lukoil	83–63	Cherno More Ticha	Universiada Hall, Sofia
18:30(UTC+02)	Scoring by quarter: 22-20, 12-19, 27-16, 22-8
	Pts: Nikolov 17; Rebs: Clanton, Nikolov 9 Asts: Avramov, Velikov, Clanton 4 PIR: Nikolov 24	Boxscore	Pts: Ostrev 22; Rebs: Hristov, Iliev 5 Asts: Georgiev 4 PIR: Ostrev 20

17 January 2018	Beroe	79–81 (Series: 157-165)	Bultex 99	Municipal Hall, Stara Zagora
18:00(UTC+02)	Scoring by quarter: 31-26, 15-22, 14-17, 19-16
BNT HD	Pts: DiNunno 30; Rebs: Yanev 16; Asts: Hadzhirusev 4 PIR: Yanev 31	Boxscore	Pts: Durchev 20; Rebs: Maravich 11; Asts: Durchev, Bachev 5 PIR: Durchev 22

17 January 2018	Balkan Botevgrad	94–61 (Series: 177-115)	PBC Academic	Arena Botevgrad, Botevgrad
18:00(UTC+02)	Scoring by quarter: 23-18, 20-14, 24-16, 27-13
	Pts: Kesar 21; Rebs: Haughton 11; Asts: Zahariev 6 PIR: Zahariev 30	Boxscore	Pts: Milov 18; Rebs: Milov 7 Asts: Chernokozhev 3 PIR: Milov 18

17 January 2018	Rilski Sportist	106–74 (Series: 189-151)	Yambol	Arena Samokov, Samokov
18:00(UTC+02)	Scoring by quarter: 26-17, 22-15, 30-19, 28-23
	Pts: Georgiev 19; Rebs: Taylor 10; Asts: Vasov 8 PIR: Georgiev 19	Boxscore	Pts: Perine 18; Rebs: Petkov 6 Asts: Arnett, Govedarov 3 PIR: Arnett 16

17 January 2018	Cherno More Ticha	63–70 (Series: 126-153)	Levski Lukoil	Hristo Borisov Hall, Varna
18:00(UTC+02)	Scoring by quarter: 15-16, 19-21, 17-18, 12-15
	Pts: Iliev 16; Rebs: Iliev 11; Asts: Hristov 5 PIR: Iliev, Tubak, Nikolv 15		Pts: Nikolov 18; Rebs: Knox 7 Asts: Avramov 8 PIR: Avramov, Knox 18

== Semifinals ==
14 February 2018	Levski Lukoil	73–62	Balkan Botevgrad	Universiada Hall, Sofia
18:00(UTC+02)	Scoring by quarter: 8-13, 24-9, 19-23, 22-17
BNT HD	Pts: Nikolov 19; Rebs: Clanton 13; Asts: Avramov, Velikov, Ivanov, Nikolov 4 PIR: Nikolov 26	Boxscore	Pts: Petkov, Zahariev 16; Rebs: Zahariev 7 Asts: Callahan 6 PIR: Petkov, Zahariev 16

14 February 2018	Rilski Sportist	86–98	Bultex 99	Arena Samokov, Samokov
18:00(UTC+02)	Scoring by quarter: 18-26, 24-28, 24-14, 20-30
	Pts: Wright Jr 16; Rebs: Taylor 8 Asts: Wright Jr 7 PIR: Bozov 18	Boxscore	Pts: Dimitrov 22; Rebs: Durchev, Maravich 7 Asts: Umipig 6 PIR: Dimitrov 24

17 February 2018	Balkan Botevgrad	87–80 (Series: 149-153)	Levski Lukoil	Arena Botevgrad, Botevgrad
18:00(UTC+02)	Scoring by quarter: 23-18, 20-12, 21-32, 23-18
BNT HD	Pts: Washington 18; Rebs: Haughton 8 Asts: Zahariev 6 PIR: Washington 27	Boxscore	Pts: Marinov 24; Rebs: Clanton 8 Asts: Nikolov 4 PIR: Marinov 29

17 February 2018	Bultex 99	70–83 (Series: 168-169)	Rilski Sportist	Arena Sila, Plovdiv
18:00(UTC+02)	Scoring by quarter: 17-24, 19-26, 20-13, 14-20
	Pts: Maravich 15; Rebs: Dimitrov 8 Asts: Umipig, Dimitrov 4 PIR: Gruev, Dimitrov 15	Boxscore	Pts: Ravanel 21; Rebs: Ravanel 10; Asts: Wright Jr 4 PIR: Ravanel 27

== Final ==
3 March 2018	Rilski Sportist	89–80	Levski Lukoil	PCS "Vasil Levski", Veliko Turnovo
17:30(UTC+02)	Scoring by quarter: 27-22, 17-23, 23-15, 22-20
	Pts: Bozov 21; Rebs: Ravenel 6 Asts: Wright Jr. 8 PIR: Bozov 25	Boxscore	Pts: Milošević 18; Rebs: Clanton; Asts: Marinov 4 PIR: Milošević 17

Starters:			Pts	Reb	Ast
SF	12	(Bulgaria) Zlatin Georgiev	12	4	3
G	14	(Bulgaria) Yordan Bozov	21	5	3
PF	8	(United States) Sheldon Jeter	14	5	2
C	4	(United States) Travis Taylor	5	2	0
PG	7	(United States) Derek Wright Jr.	19	2	8
Reserves:					
PF	33	(Bulgaria) Dimitar Marincheski	0	1	0
SG	24	(Bulgaria) Martin Marinov	3	0	1
PG	21	(Bulgaria) Darin Ivanov	1	0	0
SF	99	(Bulgaria) Samuel Francis	0	0	0
C	41	(Bulgaria) Denislav Vutev	0	0	0
F	23	(Bulgaria) Miroslav Vasov	0	0	0
PF	30	(United States) Evan Ravenel	14	6	3
Head coach:
(Bulgarian Basketball Federation) Ludmil Hadzhisotirov

Rilski Sportist	Levski Lukoil

Starters:			Pts	Reb	Ast
F	18	(Bulgaria) Hristo Nikolov	14	4	1
G	23	(Bulgaria) Stanimir Marinov	15	1	4
PG	6	(Bulgaria) Bozhidar Avramov	4	2	3
PF	0	(Montenegro) Nemanja Milošević	18	4	3
C	33	(United States) Keith Clanton	10	10	2
Reserves:					
PF	5	(Bulgaria) Veselin Veselinov	0	0	0
PG	13	(Bulgaria) Asen Velikov	0	0	0
G/F	10	(Bulgaria) Kris Minkov	0	0	0
SG	22	(Bulgaria) Pavlin Ivanov	12	1	2
PF	9	(Bulgaria) Alex Simeonov	0	0	0
F/C	24	(United States) Justine Knox	4	6	0
PG	25	(United States) Darryl Brown	3	0	1
Head coach:
(Bulgarian Basketball Federation) Konstantin Papazov
