= 2018–19 Bulgarian Basketball Cup =

Bulgarian Basketball Cup
- Season: 2018–19
- Duration: 27 December 2018 – 2 March 2019
- Games played: 13
- Teams: 8

Regular season
- Season MVP: Avramov

Statistical leaders
Points	Isiah Williams	21.5
Rebounds	Mikael Hopkins	10.5
Assists	Brandon Brown	7

Records
- Biggest home win: Levski Lukoil 92–74 PBC Academic (13 February 2019)
- Biggest away win: Balkan 73–96 Levski Lukoil (16 January 2019)
- Highest scoring: Bultex 99 95–78 Yambol (16 January 2019)

The 2018–19 Bulgarian Basketball Cup is the 65th edition of the annual cup tournament in Bulgaria.It is managed by the Bulgarian Basketball Federation.The competition will start on December 27, 2018, with the quarterfinals and will end with the Final on March 2, 2019 in Panagyurishte.

== Format ==
This season, only clubs from National Basketball League (Bulgaria) will participate, except Cherno More, which withdrew from the competition. The quarterfinals and semifinals are played in a double-legged format, while the Final is played in single game on a neutral venue.

== Participating clubs ==
2018–19 NBL
8 clubs

Bultex 99
Balkan
Beroe
Levski Lukoil
PBC Academic
Rilski Sportist
Spartak Pleven
Yambol

== Bracket ==
Quarterfinals; 27–16 January
Levski Lukoil	80	96	176
Balkan	81	73	154
Bultex 99	95	79	174
Yambol	78	72	150
Rilski Sportist	67	87	154
Beroe	78	80	158
Academic	83	75	158
Spartak Pleven	68	70	138

Semifinals; 13–16 February
Levski Lukoil	92	77	169
Bultex 99	74	87	161
Beroe	84	82	166
Academic	67	89	156

Final; 2 March
Levski Lukoil	70
Beroe	61

Source: Basketball.bg

== Quarterfinals ==
27 December 2018	Levski Lukoil	80–81	Balkan	Universiada Hall, Sofia
19:00(UTC+02)	Scoring by quarter: 11-25, 22-26, 31-16, 16-14
	Pts: Rembert 32; Rebs: Zahariev 8 Asts: Zahariev, Rembert 4 PIR: Rembert 31	Boxscore	Pts: Brown 18; Rebs: Hopkins 11; Asts: Brown 11; PIR: Brown 31

27 December 2018	Bultex 99	95–78	Yambol	Kolodruma
18:30(UTC+02)	Scoring by quarter: 26-14, 15-32, 26-14, 28-18
	Pts: Vitkovic 19; Rebs: Vitkovic 7 Asts: Knight, Vitkovic 4 PIR: Vitkovic 29	Boxscore	Pts: Williams 22; Rebs: Petkov 8 Asts: Ivanov 10; PIR: Ivanov 28

27 December 2018	Rilski Sportist	67–78	Beroe	Arena Samokov, Samokov
18:00(UTC+02)	Scoring by quarter: 15-26, 15-17, 20-22, 17-13
	Pts: Jenkins 18; Rebs: Jenkins 7 Asts: Harris, Marinov 5 PIR: Jenkins 17	Boxscore	Pts: Frankamp 18; Rebs: Bachynski 11; Asts: Frankamp 11; PIR: Frankamp 28

27 December 2018	Academic	83–68	Spartak Pleven	Sports Complex Hall, Pravets
18:00(UTC+02)	Scoring by quarter: 26-19, 15-13, 20-18, 22-18
	Pts: Dimitrov 19; Rebs: Ivanov 8 Asts: Dimitrov 7 PIR: Dimitrov 28	Boxscore	Pts: Marinov 21; Rebs: Varbanov 9 Asts: Ostrev, Marinov 4 PIR: Marinov 24

16 January 2019	Balkan	73–96 (Series: 154-176)	Levski Lukoil	Arena Botevgrad, Botevgrad
	Scoring by quarter: 21-24, 6-25, 25-20, 21-27
BNT 3	Pts: Brown 16; Rebs: Hopkins 9 Asts: Hopkins 4 PIR: Hopkins 18	Boxscore	Pts: Rembert 20; Rebs: Ivanov, Zahariev 6 Asts: Avramov 7 PIR: Zahariev, Rembert 25

16 January 2019	Yambol	72–79 (Series: 150-174)	Bultex 99	Diana, Yambol
	Scoring by quarter: 26-19, 19-18, 17-23, 10-19
	Pts: Williams 21; Rebs: Ivanov 6 Asts: Williams 3 PIR: Petkov, Williams 15	Boxscore	Pts: Bachev 26; Rebs: Olisemeka 10; Asts: Knight 4 PIR: Bachev 24

16 January 2019	Beroe	80–87(OT) (Series: 158-154)	Rilski Sportist	Municipal Hall, Stara Zagora
	Scoring by quarter: 20-18, 26-12, 11-29, 15-24, Overtime: 8-4
	Pts: Frankamp 24; Rebs: White 11; Asts: Frankamp 4 PIR: White, Yanev 23	Boxscore	Pts: Gugino 22; Rebs: Gugino 11; Asts: Georgiev 5 PIR: Gugino 24

16 January 2019	Spartak Pleven	70–75 (Series: 138-158)	Academic	Balkanstroy Hall, Pleven
	Scoring by quarter: 19-11, 20-30, 20-16, 11-18
	Pts: Kochev 19; Rebs: Vutev 11; Asts: Ostrev 8 PIR: Vutev 26	Boxscore	Pts: Milov 23; Rebs: Milov, Iliev 7 Asts: Dudev 4 PIR: Milov 22

== Semifinals ==
13 February 2019	Beroe	84–67	Academic	Municipal Hall, Stara Zagora
	Scoring by quarter: 21-14, 25-16, 23-16, 15-21
	Pts: Coggins, Yanev 15; Rebs: Yanev 15; Asts: Zhelev, Coggins 4 PIR: Vaklinov 22	Boxscore	Pts: Nikolov, Lazarov 15; Rebs: Chernokozhev 9 Asts: Grozev, Dudev 3 PIR: Milov 21

13 February 2019	Levski Lukoil	92–74	Bultex 99	Universiada Hall, Sofia
	Scoring by quarter: 23-24, 29-27, 19-10, 21-13
	Pts: Zahariev 20; Rebs: Ivanov, Zahariev 10; Asts: Ivanov 7 PIR: Zahariev 35	Boxscore	Pts: Bachev 19; Rebs: Olisemeka 7 Asts: Gruev, Bachev 3 PIR: Bachev 18

16 February 2019	Bultex 99	87–77	Levski Lukoil	Kolodruma
19:00(UTC+02)	Scoring by quarter: 19-23, 24-18, 20-19, 24-17
BNT 3	Pts: Vitkovic 19; Rebs: Olisemeka 10; Asts: Franklin 7 PIR: Vitkovic 25	Boxscore	Pts: Avramov 20; Rebs: Zahariev 9 Asts: Ivanov 7 PIR: Zahariev 28

16 February 2019	Academic	89–82	Beroe	Sports Complex Hall, Pravets
18:00(UTC+02)	Scoring by quarter: 24-25, 15-22, 24-18, 26-17
	Pts: Lazarov 20; Rebs: Ivanov, Milov 6 Asts: Dudev 12; PIR: Lazarov 19	Boxscore	Pts: Stoyanov 21; Rebs: Yanev 9 Asts: Frankamp, Yanev 4 PIR: Stoyanov 26

== Final ==
2 March 2019	Levski Lukoil	70–61	Beroe	Arena Asarel, Panagyurishte
19:00	Scoring by quarter: 16-17, 19-5, 19-27, 16-12
	Pts: Avramov 17; Rebs: Zahariev 10; Asts: Avramov 8 PIR: Avramov 25	Boxscore	Pts: Frankamp 21; Rebs: Frankamp 9 Asts: Frankamp 5 PIR: Frankamp 22

Starters:			Pts	Reb	Ast
PF	44	(Bulgaria) Dejan Ivanov	11	6	1
PF	55	(Bulgaria) Kaloyan Ivanov	7	3	2
SG	10	(Bulgaria) Bozhidar Avramov	17	2	8
G/F	32	(Bulgaria) Hristo Zahariev	15	10	2
PG	11	(United States) Patrick Rembert	10	4	4
Reserves:					
PG	13	(Bulgaria) Asen Velikov	0	1	0
PG	1	(Bulgaria) Deyan Karamfilov	0	0	0
G/F	8	(Bulgaria) Gerasim Nikolov	0	0	0
C	41	(Bulgaria) Krastan Krastanov	0	0	0
C	33	(Serbia) Nikola Maravic	8	4	0
PF	7	(Serbia) Milivoje Mijovic	2	2	0
G	0	(United States) Russell Robinson Jr.	0	2	1
Head coach:
(Bulgaria) Konstantin Papazov

Levski Lukoil	Beroe

Starters:			Pts	Reb	Ast
C	15	(Bulgaria) Stanislav Vaklinov	0	3	0
SF	8	(Bulgaria) Nikolay Stoyanov	7	5	2
F/C	1	(United States) James White	7	8	0
PG	33	(United States) Connor Frankamp	21	9	5
SG	3	(United States) Trenton Coggins	4	4	1
Reserves:					
PF	12	(Bulgaria) Aleksandar Yanev	14	5	0
SG	24	(Bulgaria) Tihomir Zhelev	3	1	3
PG	0	(Bulgaria) Nikolay Titkov	0	0	0
SG	10	(Bulgaria) Evgeni Vasilev	0	0	0
PF	9	(Bulgaria) Ivaylo Tonev	0	0	0
G	2	(United States) Paul Miller	2	4	1
F	23	(United States) Terrence Jennings	3	4	0
Head coach:
(Bulgaria) Lyubomir Minchev
