= 2020 Bulgarian Basketball Cup =

Bulgarian Basketball Cup
- Season: 2019–20
- Duration: 6 February 2020 – 9 February 2020
- Games played: 7
- Teams: 8

Regular season
- Season MVP: Zahariev

The 2020 Bulgarian Basketball Cup was the 66th edition of the annual cup tournament in Bulgaria.It is managed by the Bulgarian Basketball Federation and was held in Sofia, in Universiada Hall. The competition started at 6th of February 2020, with the quarterfinals and ended with the Final on February 9, 2020.

== Qualified teams ==
The first eight teams qualified after the first stage of the 2019-20 NBL regular season .

Pos	Team	Pld	W	L	Seed
1	Balkan Botevgrad	18	17	1	Seeded teams
2	Levski Lukoil (H)	18	16	2	Seeded teams
3	Beroe	18	13	5	Seeded teams
4	Rilski Sportist	18	13	5	Seeded teams
5	Academic Sofia	18	8	10	Non-seeded Teams
6	Cherno More Ticha	18	7	11	Non-seeded Teams
7	Academic Bultex 99	18	7	11	Non-seeded Teams
8	Chernomorets	18	4	14	Non-seeded Teams
9	Spartak Pleven	18	3	15	Did not qualify
10	Yambol	18	2	16	Did not qualify

== Bracket ==
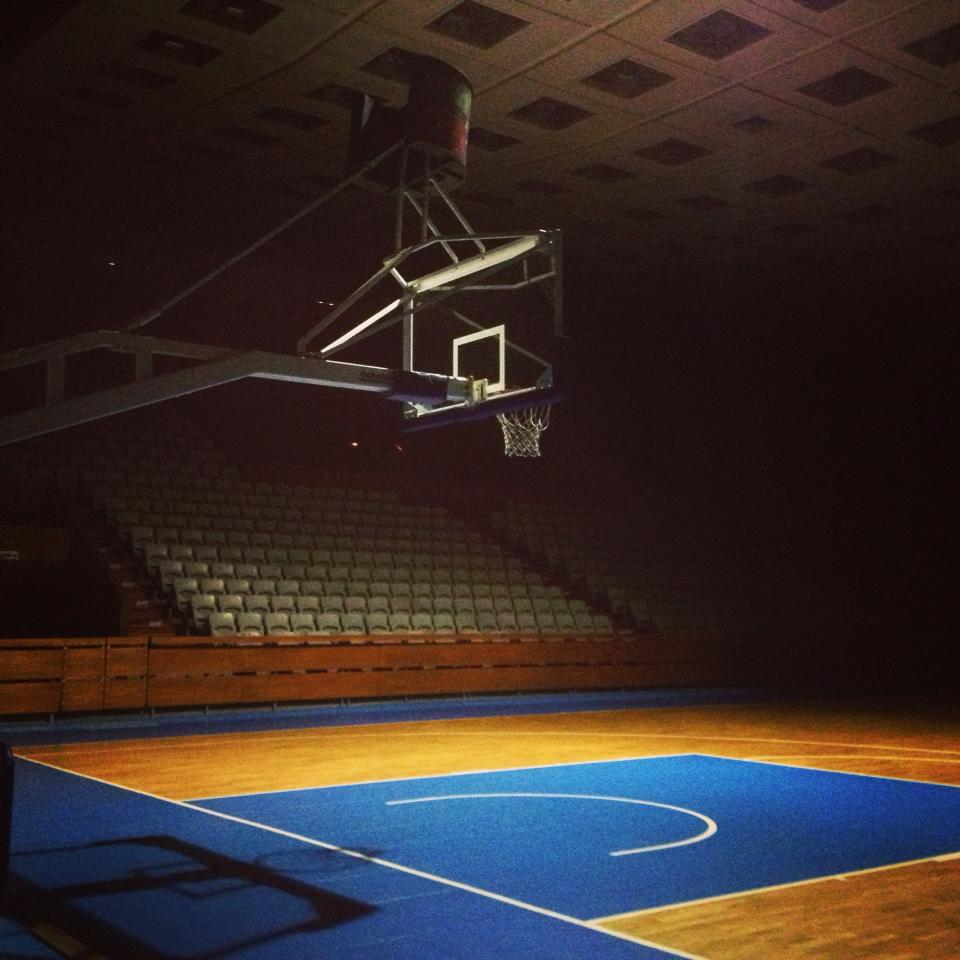
Universiada Hall

Quarterfinals
Levski	115
Bultex 99	74
Beroe	85
Chernomorets	73
Balkan Botevgrad	101
Cherno More Ticha	53
Rilski Sportist	119
Academic	97

Semifinals
Levski	81
Beroe	62
Balkan Botevgrad	82
Rilski Sportist	75

Final
Levski	86
Balkan Botevgrad	78

== Quarterfinals ==
6 February	Levski	115–74	Bultex 99	Universiada Hall, Sofia
18:00(UTC+02)	Scoring by quarter: 24-21, 36-15, 26-17, 29-21
		Boxscore

6 February	Beroe	85–73	Chernomorets	Universiada Hall, Sofia
20:30(UTC+02)	Scoring by quarter: 28-24, 15-15, 24-19, 18-15
		Boxscore

7 February	Balkan Botevgrad	101–53	Cherno More Ticha	Universiada Hall, Sofia
18:00(UTC+02)	Scoring by quarter: 29-15, 20-18, 23-13, 29-7
		Boxscore

7 February	Rilski Sportist	119–97	Academic	Universiada Hall, Sofia
20:30(UTC+02)
		Boxscore

== Semifinals ==
6 February	Levski	81–62	Beroe	Universiada Hall, Sofia
18:00(UTC+02)	Scoring by quarter: 27-16, 23-15, 13-12, 18-19
		Boxscore

6 February	Balkan Botevgrad	82–75	Rilski Sportist	Universiada Hall, Sofia
20:30(UTC+02)	Scoring by quarter: 25-17, 16-19, 28-22, 13-17
		Boxscore

== Finals ==
9 February 2019	Levski Lukoil	86–78	Balkan Botevgrad	Universiada Hall, Sofia
18:00	Scoring by quarter: 23-10, 21-27, 22-18, 20-23
	Pts: Zahariev 25; Rebs: Knowles 7 Asts: Young; PIR: Zahariev 25	Boxscore	Pts: Knight 19; Rebs: Simeonov 7 Asts: Dimitrov, Radonjic 4 PIR: Simeonov 16

Starters:			Pts	Reb	Ast
PF	15	(Serbia) Danilo Tasic	16	3	2
SG	9	(Bulgaria) Chavdar Kostov	11	2	1
C	77	(United States) Zane Knowles	11	7	0
G/F	32	(Bulgaria) Hristo Zahariev	25	5	5
PG	13	(Bulgaria) Asen Velikov	2	6	6
Reserves:					
PG	11	(United States) Brandon Young	6	4	9
PG	35	(Bulgaria) Ventsislav Petkov	12	4	2
F	11	(Bulgaria) Yordan Minchev	0	2	2
PF	10	(United States) Jyles Smith	0	0	0
C	4	(United States) Ryan Wright	3	3	0
SG	20	(Bulgaria) Nikolay Lekov	0	0	0
SF	1	(Bulgaria) Borislav Mladenov	0	0	0
Head coach:
(Bulgaria) Konstantin Papazov

Levski Lukoil	Balkan

Starters:			Pts	Reb	Ast
C	13	(Serbia) Marko Radonjic	13	4	4
PF	34	(Bulgaria) Dimitar Dimitrov	9	3	4
F/C	1	(United States) Kenny Hall	6	5	1
CG	0	(United States) Daishon Knight	19	2	2
G/F	3	(Bulgaria) Kris Minkov	5	2	1
Reserves:					
PF	12	(Bulgaria) Ivko Ivkov	2	2	0
F	23	(Bulgaria) Aleks Simeonov	16	7	1
PG	2	(United States) Casey Benson	5	2	3
G	29	(Bulgaria) Stanislav Tsonkov	0	0	0
PF	12	(Montenegro) Mihailo Sekulovic	3	4	0
Head coach:
(Bulgaria) Jovica Arsic
