= 2014–15 National Basketball League (Bulgaria) season =

74th season of the Bulgarian NBL

NBL
- Games played: 108 (regular season); 25 (Playoffs)
- Teams: 9
- TV partner(s): BNT

Regular season
- Season MVP: (United States) Tyler Laser

Finals
- Champions: Lukoil Academic (24th title)
- Runners-up: Balkan Botevgrad
- Third place: Cherno More Port Varna
- Fourth place: Rilski Sportist

The 2014–15 National Basketball League (Bulgaria) season was the 74th season of the Bulgarian NBL. The season started on October 11, 2014.

== Teams ==
2014–15 Bulgarian National Basketball League club locations.

Club	2013–14 season	Arena	Capacity
Balkan Botevgrad	2nd	Arena Botevgrad	4,000
Beroe	9th	Municipal Hall	1,000
Cherno More Port Varna	4th	Hristo Borisov	1,000
Chernomorets	8th	Boycho Branzov	1,000
Levski Sofia	3rd	Universiada Hall	4,000
Lukoil Academic	1st	Sports Complex Hall	1,000
Rilski Sportist	6th	Arena Samokov	2,500
Spartak Pleven	7th	Balkanstroy	1,200
Yambol	5th	Diana	3,000

== Regular season ==
Pos	Team	Pld	W	L	PF	PA	PD	Pts	Qualification or relegation
1	Lukoil Academic	24	23	1	2213	1776	+437	47	Qualification to playoffs
2	Balkan Botevgrad	24	18	6	2183	1772	+411	42	Qualification to playoffs
3	Rilski Sportist	24	16	8	2114	1929	+185	40	Qualification to playoffs
4	Cherno More Port Varna	24	15	9	2076	1937	+139	39	Qualification to playoffs
5	Levski Sofia	24	15	9	2034	1896	+138	39	Qualification to playoffs
6	Beroe	24	10	14	1951	1993	−42	34	Qualification to playoffs
7	Yambol	24	8	16	2007	2127	−120	32	Qualification to playoffs
8	Chernomorets	24	2	22	1597	2352	−755	26	Qualification to playoffs
9	Spartak Pleven	24	1	23	1760	2152	−392	25	

Source: NBL

== Playoffs ==
Quarterfinals
1	Lukoil Academic	119	124
8	Chernomorets	51	57
4	Cherno More	93	77
5	Levski Sofia	71	68
2	Balkan Botevgrad	94	75	90
7	Yambol	83	78	74
3	Rilski Sportist	94	78
6	Beroe	86	65

Semifinals
1	Lukoil Academic	86	94	65	83
4	Cherno More Port Varna	66	86	91	81
2	Balkan Botevgrad	91	72	85	68	84
6	Rilski Sportist	66	77	80	85	65

Finals
1	Lukoil Academic	82	80	78	80	87
2	Balkan Botevgrad	81	88	82	78	77
Third place
3	Rilski Sportist	79	88
4	Cherno More	93	92

== NBL clubs in European competitions ==
Team	Competition	Progress
Lukoil Academic	EuroChallenge	Regular season
Levski Sofia	ABA League	Regular season
Rilski Sportist	Balkan League	Runner-up
