= Bulgarian Basketball Cup MVP =

The Bulgarian Basketball Cup MVP is an award that is given to the most outstanding player in the Bulgarian Basketball Cup tournament. The winner of the award is decided by a panel of the Bulgarian Basketball Federation. The winner of the award is not necessarily coming from the team that wins the cup title.

== Winners ==
Season	Nat.	Player	Pos.	Club	Ref.
2015	(Bulgaria)	Stanimir Marinov	G	Cherno More Port Varna	
2016	(United States)	Tony Gugino	PF	Rilski Sportist	
2017	(United States)	Travis Daniels	SF	Balkan Botevgrad	
2017–18	(Bulgaria)	Yordan Bozov	G	Rilski Sportist	
2018–19	(Bulgaria)	Bozhidar Avramov	G	Levski Lukoil	
2020	(Bulgaria)	Hristo Zahariev	G/F	Levski Lukoil	
2021	(Chile)	Nico Carvacho	C	Rilski Sportist	
2022	(Bulgaria)	Pavlin Ivanov	SG	Rilski Sportist	
2023	(Ukraine)	Serhii Pavlov	PF a	Levski Sofia	
2024	(Bulgaria)	Alex Ouandie	SG	Chernomorets	
2025	(Bulgaria)	Nikolay Stoyanov	SG	Cherno More Ticha	
2026	(United States)	Lamont West	PF	Cherno More Ticha	

== Awards won by nationality ==
Country	Total
Bulgaria	7
United States	3
Chile	1
Ukraine	1

== Awards won by club ==
Country	Total
Rilski Sportist	4
Levski Sofia	3
Cherno More Port Varna	3
Balkan Botevgrad	1
Chernomorets	1
