= 2015–16 National Basketball League (Bulgaria) season =

NBL
- Games played: 135 (regular season); 20 (Playoffs)
- Teams: 10
- TV partner(s): BNT

Regular season
- Season MVP: (Serbia) Milijan Bocka

Finals
- Champions: Lukoil Academic (25th title)
- Runners-up: Balkan Botevgrad
- Third place: Rilski Sportist
- Fourth place: Spartak Pleven
- Finals MVP: (Bulgaria) Pavlin Ivanov

The 2015–16 National Basketball League (Bulgaria) season was the 75th season of the Bulgarian NBL. The season started on October 10, 2015.

== Teams ==
2015–16 Bulgarian National Basketball League club locations.

Club	2014–15 season	Hall	Capacity
Academic Bultex 99	New	Stroitel Hall	1,000
Balkan Botevgrad	2nd	Arena Botevgrad	4,000
Beroe	6th	Municipal Hall	1,000
Cherno More Port Varna	4th	Hristo Borisov	1,000
Chernomorets	8th	Boycho Branzov	1,000
Levski Sofia	5th	Universiada Hall	4,000
Lukoil Academic	1st	Sports Complex Hall	1,000
Rilski Sportist	3rd	Arena Samokov	2,500
Spartak Pleven	9th	Balkanstroy	1,200
Yambol	7th	Diana	3,000

== Regular season ==
Pos	Team	Pld	W	L	PF	PA	PD	Pts	Qualification or relegation
1	Lukoil Academic	27	25	2	2494	1956	+538	52	Qualification to playoffs
2	Balkan Botevgrad	27	21	6	2423	1989	+434	48	Qualification to playoffs
3	Beroe	27	20	7	2234	2082	+152	47	Qualification to playoffs
4	Rilski Sportist	27	18	9	2357	2115	+242	45	Qualification to playoffs
5	Cherno More Port Varna	27	13	14	2184	2263	−79	40	Qualification to playoffs
6	Spartak Pleven	27	12	15	2212	2364	−152	39	Qualification to playoffs
7	Levski Sofia	27	11	16	2102	2204	−102	38	Qualification to playoffs
8	Yambol	27	7	20	2142	2331	−189	34	Qualification to playoffs
9	Academic Bultex 99	27	6	21	2051	2302	−251	33	
10	Chernomorets	27	2	25	1933	2526	−593	29	

Source: NBL

== Playoffs ==
Quarterfinals
1	Lukoil Academic	91	105
8	Yambol	62	59
4	Rilski Sportist	97	76
5	Cherno More Port Varna	84	72
2	Balkan Botevgrad	86	109
7	Levski Sofia	74	104
3	Beroe	81	81	73
6	Spartak Pleven	86	74	79

Semifinals
1	Lukoil Academic	92	85	93
4	Rilski Sportist	83	71	68
2	Balkan Botevgrad	73	97	85
6	Spartak Pleven	57	69	73

Finals
1	Lukoil Academic	72	79	86
2	Balkan Botevgrad	70	59	81
Third place
4	Rilski Sportist	73	79
6	Spartak Pleven	66	65

== NBL clubs in European competitions ==
Team	Competition	Progress
Lukoil Academic	FIBA Europe Cup	Round of 32
Rilski Sportist	FIBA Europe Cup	Regular season
Beroe	Balkan League	Semi Final
Levski Sofia	Balkan League	Second round
