= 2017–18 National Basketball League (Bulgaria) season =

NBL
- Duration: 7 October 2017– 29 May 2018
- Games played: 108 (Regular season); 23 (Playoffs)
- Teams: 9
- TV partner: BNT

Regular season
- Season MVP: (United States) Alan Arnett

Finals
- Champions: Levski Lukoil
- Runners-up: Balkan Botevgrad
- Third place: Rilski Sportist
- Fourth place: Academic Bultex 99
- Finals MVP: (Bulgaria) Bozhidar Avramov

Statistical leaders
Points	(United States) Alan Arnett	21.73
Rebounds	(United States) Darrius Garrett	10.2
Assists	(Bulgaria) Milen Dudev	6.2
Index Rating	(United States) Alan Arnett	27.0

Records
- Biggest home win: Academic Sofia 131–68 Cherno More Ticha (28 October 2017)
- Biggest away win: Academic Sofia 51–93 Academic Bultex 99 (13 January 2018)
- Highest scoring: Yambol 116–106 Spartak (17 March 2018)
- Winning streak: 7 Games - 3 Teams (Academic Sofia, Balkan, Levski Lukoil)
- Losing streak: 13 Games Spartak Pleven

The 2017–18 National Basketball League (Bulgaria) season was the 77th season of the Bulgarian NBL. The season started on October 7, 2017 and ended on May 29, 2018.

== Teams ==
2017–18 Bulgarian National Basketball League club locations.

The same nine teams of the previous season repeated participation in the 2017–18 season.

Club	Last season	Arena	Location	Capacity
Academic Bultex 99	2nd	Arena Sila	Plovdiv	1,000
Balkan Botevgrad	5th	Arena Botevgrad	Botevgrad	4,500
Beroe	3rd	Municipal Hall	Stara Zagora	1,000
Cherno More Ticha	7th	Hristo Borisov	Varna	1,000
Levski Lukoil (Note: Academic started the season as "Lukoil Academic". However, from January 2018 main sponsor Lukoil left the team for Levski Sofia. Levski was named "Levski Lukoil", while the other club was simply named "Academic".)	9th	Universiada Hall	Sofia	4,000
Academic Sofia	1st	Sports Complex Hall	Pravets	1,000
Rilski Sportist	4th	Arena Samokov	Samokov	2,500
Spartak Pleven	6th	Balkanstroy	Pleven	1,200
Yambol	8th	Diana	Yambol	3,000

== Regular season ==
In the regular season, teams play against each other three times home-and-away in a double round-robin format. The eight first qualified teams advance to the playoffs.

=== League table ===
Pos	Team	Pld	W	L	PF	PA	PD	Pts	Qualification
1	Levski Lukoil	24	18	6	2018	1777	+241	42	Advance to playoffs
2	Academic Bultex 99	24	18	6	1959	1762	+197	42	Advance to playoffs
3	Balkan Botevgrad (Note: Academic Plovdiv was awarded 20-0 win, due to illegal use of 5 foreigner players at the same time by Balkan, on 1 April 2018. Additionally Balkan would take 0 points from this game. The original score was 86-76, for Balkan.)	24	19	5	2003	1780	+223	42	Advance to playoffs
4	Rilski Sportist	24	16	8	2098	1895	+203	40	Advance to playoffs
5	Beroe	24	12	12	2050	1955	+95	36	Advance to playoffs
6	Academic Sofia	24	10	14	1946	2013	−67	34	Advance to playoffs
7	Yambol	24	8	16	1983	2204	−221	32	Advance to playoffs
8	Cherno More Ticha	24	5	19	1789	2067	−278	29	Advance to playoffs
9	Spartak Pleven	24	2	22	1961	2354	−393	26	

Source: NBL

=== Results ===
==== First stage ====
Home \ Away	ACP	ACS	BAL	BER	CHE	LEV	RIL	SPA	YAM
Academic Bultex 99	—	66–81	80–70	85–53	88–66	77–96	79–74	94–75	78–72
Academic Sofia	51–93	—	91–99	75–96	131–68	70–96	95–75	105–78	112–81
Balkan Botevgrad	85–78	69–65	—	87–80	104–83	67–70	83–78	106–76	97–83
Beroe	91–94	66–95	67–92	—	94–68	74–81	68–96	111–76	102–85
Cherno More Ticha	81–71	101–70	75–82	97–91	—	62–88	73–80	105–99	93–99
Levski Lukoil	70–82	78–84	63–86	71–73	63–53	—	67–73	108–65	108–88
Rilski Sportist	97–89	76–93	86–70	96–88	120–73	72–73	—	84–54	101–75
Spartak Pleven	88–97	111–71	81–102	83–104	68–80	87–93	89–105	—	77–91
Yambol	70–78	90–83	79–86	84–103	76–70	77–89	78–106	87–73	—

Source: NBL
Legend: Blue = home team win; Red = away team win.

==== Second stage ====
Home and away games depend on table after the first stage.

Home \ Away	ACP	ACS	BAL	BER	CHE	LEV	RIL	SPA	YAM
Academic Bultex	—	85–65	—	82–70	71–62	—	—	—	94–81
Academic Sofia	—	—	—	78–104	75–69	—	—	101–73	81–87
Balkan	0–20	93–49	—	—	—	79–71	92–80	—	—
Beroe	—	—	91–66	—	76–60	—	—	115–85	88–61
Cherno More	—	—	76–81	—	—	63–89	67–91	76–89	—
Levski Lukoil	109–97	78–57	—	78–68	—	—	—	—	100–70
Rilski Sportist	74–78	81–68	—	79–77	—	73–75	—	—	—
Spartak Pleven	81–103	—	80–102	—	—	80–104	86–94	—	—
Yambol	—	—	78–104	—	71–68	—	104–107	116–106	—

Source: NBL
Legend: Blue = home team win; Red = away team win.

== Playoffs ==
Quarterfinals
1	Levski Lukoil	93	81
8	Cherno More	67	79
4	Rilski Sportist	91	80
5	Beroe	81	70
2	Academic Plovdiv	94	79	103
7	Yambol	75	97	72
3	Balkan	99	98
6	Academic Sofia	56	68

Semifinals
1	Levski Lukoil	90	77	76	85
4	Rilski Sportist	69	78	73	81
2	Academic Plovdiv	78	68	74	91
3	Balkan	79	59	97	102

Finals
1	Levski Lukoil	69	71	71	86
3	Balkan	71	65	60	85
Third place
2	Academic Plovdiv	56	77
4	Rilski Sportist	77	92

== Player of the round ==
Player of the round
Round	Player	Team	PIR
1	(United States) Alex Davis	Beroe	33
2	(Bulgaria) Pavel Ivanov	Balkan	31
3	(Bulgaria) Aleksandar Yanev	Beroe	40
4	(Bulgaria) Nikolay Stoyanov	Levski Lukoil	37
5	(Serbia) Igor Kesar	Balkan	34
6	(Bulgaria) Aleksandar Yanev	Beroe	38
7	(United States) Sheldon Jeter	Rilski Sportist	29
8	(United States) Alex Davis	Beroe	36
9	(Bulgaria) Aleksandar Yanev	Beroe	35
10	(Bulgaria) Aleksandar Yanev	Beroe	41
11	(United States) Alan Arnett	Yambol	39
12	(Ivory Coast) Adjehi Baru	Beroe	42
13	(Bulgaria) Aleksandar Milov	Academic Sofia	40
14	(United States) Alan Arnett	Yambol	34
15	(Bulgaria) Konstantin Koev	Spartak Pleven	35
16	(Serbia) Igor Kesar	Balkan	42
17	(United States) Alan Arnett	Yambol	48
18	(Serbia) Dragan Tubak	Cherno More	38
19	(United States) Alan Arnett	Yambol	36
20	(United States) Alan Arnett	Yambol	32
21	(United States) Devon Washington	Balkan	30
22	(Bulgaria) Konstantin Koev	Spartak Pleven	40
23	(United States) Jordan Callahan	Balkan	32
24	(United States) Darrius Garrett	Beroe	31
25	(United States) Devon Washington	Balkan	36
26	(Bulgaria) Dimitar Dimitrov	Academic Plovdiv	41
27	(United States) Devon Washington	Balkan	27

== NBL clubs in European competitions ==
Team	Competition	Progress
Academic Sofia	FIBA Europe Cup	Regular season
Beroe	FIBA Europe Cup	Second qualifying round
Rilski Sportist	FIBA Europe Cup	First qualifying round
Balkan	FIBA Europe Cup	Regular season

== NBL clubs in regional competitions ==
Team	Competition	Progress
Academic Plovdiv	Balkan League	Regular season
Levski Lukoil	Balkan League	Regular season
Rilski Sportist	Balkan League	Regular season
