= Yordan Bozov =

Bulgarian basketball player (born 1979)

Personal information
- Born: 25 January 1979 (age 47) Sofia, Bulgaria
- Listed height: 1.91 m (6 ft 3 in)

Career information
- NBA draft: 2001: undrafted
- Playing career: 1997–2020
- Position: Guard
- Number: 14

Career history
- 1997–2002: CSKA Sofia
- 2002–2004: Levski Sofia
- 2004–2007: CSKA Sofia
- 2007–2008: Ford Burgos
- 2008–2011: Balkan Botevgrad
- 2011–2012: Levski Sofia
- 2012–2013: Balkan Botevgrad
- 2013–2020: Rilski Sportist

Career highlights
- 3x Bulgarian Cup champion (2005, 2016, 2018); Bulgarian Cup MVP (2018)

Yordan Bozov (Bulgarian: Йордан Бозов, born 25 January 1979) is a former Bulgarian professional basketball player, who last played for Rilski Sportist. Bozov has represented the national team of his country.
