= 2019–20 National Basketball League (Bulgaria) season =

NBL
- Duration: 5 October 2019 – 13 April 2020
- Teams: 10
- TV partner(s): BNT

The 2019–20 National Basketball League (Bulgaria) season was the 79th season of the Bulgarian top basketball league.

On 13 March 2020, the Bulgarian government halted the league until 13 April 2020, due to the COVID-19 pandemic. On 16 April 2020, after a month of suspension, the Bulgarian Basketball Federation officially ended the 2019–20 season, after video conference vote of board of directors. Balkan ended the season first, with eighteen wins, but the title was not assigned.

== Teams ==
2019–20 Bulgarian National Basketball League club locations.

Chernomorets from the second league joined the same nine teams from the previous season.

Club	Last season	Arena	Location	Capacity
Academic Bultex 99	5th	Kolodruma	Plovdiv	6,100
Academic Sofia	8th	Sports Complex Hall	Pravets	1,000
Balkan Botevgrad	1st	Arena Botevgrad	Botevgrad	4,500
Beroe	3rd	Municipal Hall	Stara Zagora	1,000
Cherno More Ticha	9th	Hristo Borisov	Varna	1,000
Chernomorets		Boycho Branzov	Burgas	1,000
Levski Lukoil	2nd	Universiada Hall	Sofia	4,000
Rilski Sportist	4th	Arena Samokov	Samokov	2,500
Spartak Pleven	6th	Balkanstroy	Pleven	1,200
Yambol	8th	Diana	Yambol	3,000

== Regular season ==
In the regular season, teams played against each other three times home-and-away in a double round-robin format. The eight first qualified teams advance to the playoffs.

=== League table ===
The season was finished after 19 played games for each team.

Pos	Team	Pld	W	L	PF	PA	PD	Pts	Qualification
1	Balkan Botevgrad	19	18	1	1712	1453	+259	37	Qualification for Champions League qualifying round
2	Levski Lukoil	19	17	2	1771	1322	+449	36	
3	Rilski Sportist	19	14	5	1798	1538	+260	33	Qualification for FIBA Europe Cup
4	Beroe	19	13	6	1670	1512	+158	32	
5	Academic Sofia	19	9	10	1548	1698	−150	28	
6	Academic Bultex 99	19	8	11	1541	1544	−3	27	
7	Cherno More Ticha	19	7	12	1561	1657	−96	26	
8	Chernomorets	19	4	15	1519	1804	−285	23	
9	Spartak Pleven	19	3	16	1553	1735	−182	22	
10	Yambol	19	2	17	1393	1803	−410	21	

Updated to match(es) played on 9 March 2020. Source: NBL

=== Results ===
Home \ Away	ACP	ACS	BAL	BER	CMT	CHE	LEV	RIL	SPA	YAM	ACP	ACS	BAL	BER	CMT	CHE	LEV	RIL	SPA	YAM
Academic Bultex 99	—	88–70	73–82	91–63	84–81	95–68	81–107	91–95	79–70	116–78	—								71–75	77–61
Academic Sofia	87–83	—	88–102	71–83	92–89	99–94	77–94	72–106	77–76	97–73		—				89–72				
Balkan Botevgrad	83–64	101–78	—	86–94	101–66	83–70	77–71	85–83	100–75	112–86		101–72	—							
Beroe	94–75	103–75	65–75	—	86–85	101–61	65–84	90–86	91–77	110–76				—						
Cherno More	71–65	85–64	67–88	79–89	—	89–87	62–82	93–96	88–81	93–79					—					
Chernomorets	84–81	84–86	79–88	72–122	107–104	—	52–95	75–98	83–79	114–79			77–94			—				
Levski Lukoil	96–64	101–69	73–76	85–76	100–60	117–83	—	83–50	96–77	92–62				98–68			—			
Rilski Sportist	91–68	95–86	93–94	78–75	108–92	115–68	89–95	—	92–75	93–64						98–66		—		
Spartak Pleven	97–85	86–87	77–100	76–102	85–87	96–91	75–109	91–109	—	84–59								79–101	—	
Yambol	66–81	83–84	74–85	82–93	74–88	73–70	59–97	66–120	99–97	—				86–97						—

Updated to match(es) played on 9 March 2020. Source: NBL
Legend: Blue = home team win; Red = away team win.

== Bulgarian clubs in European competitions ==
Team	Competition	Progress
Balkan	Champions League	First qualifying round
Balkan	FIBA Europe Cup	Regular season
Levski Lukoil	FIBA Europe Cup	Regular season
Beroe	FIBA Europe Cup	Qualifying round

== NBL clubs in regional competitions ==
Team	Competition	Progress
Academic Plovdiv	Balkan League	Regular season
