= 2017–18 BIBL season =

2017–18 BIBL
- Season: 2017–18
- Duration: October 10, 2017 – April 15, 2018
- Teams: 8

Finals
- Champions: (Bulgaria) Levski (3rd title)
- Runners-up: (Kosovo) Bashkimi

The 2017–18 BIBL season is the 10th edition of Balkan International Basketball League (BIBL). The competition started on 10 October 2017.

== Competition format ==
Eight teams joined the competition and played a round robin tournament where each team faced the others in home and away games. The top two teams qualified directly for the Final Four, whereas the teams finishing on ranks 3-6 played in additional two-legged playoffs to fill the remaining two places. The league winner will be determined on a Final Four tournament, hosted by Rislki Sportist at Arena Samokov.

== Regular season ==
Pos	Team	Pld	W	L	GF	GA	GD	Pts	Qualification	RIL	BLO	LEV	ACA	BAS	TIR	IBA	KUM
1	(Bulgaria) Rilski Sportist	12	11	1	1001	835	+166	23	Advance to Final Four	—	64–87	75–62	92–85	20–0	94–79	89–71	—
2	(North Macedonia) Blokotehna	12	10	2	1068	898	+170	22	Advance to Final Four	84–85	—	74–63	80–71	93–71	100–68	90–79	—
3	(Bulgaria) Levski	12	7	5	995	907	+88	19	Qualification to play-offs	77–109	99–93	—	89–81	98–86	105–52	95–53	85−78
4	(Bulgaria) Academic Plovdiv	12	5	7	1020	932	+88	17	Qualification to play-offs	82–85	82–86	67–69	—	102–61	90–69	91–70	—
5	(Kosovo) Bashkimi	12	5	7	882	982	−100	17	Qualification to play-offs	69–105	75–91	70–63	87–78	—	101–95	100–84	—
6	(Albania) Tirana	12	3	9	920	1095	−175	15	Qualification to play-offs	78–99	67–92	79–76	61–97	75–69	—	95–65	75−73
7	(Montenegro) Ibar	12	1	11	893	1130	−237	13		61–84	74–98	68–99	83–94	78–93	107–102	—	—
8	(North Macedonia) Kumanovo (Note: Kumanovo terminated its participation due to inability to fulfil its financial obligations. All its results were annulled and its remaining games - —.) (D)	0	0	0	0	0	0	0	Expelled	80−96	—	—	86−90	—	—	96−92	—

Updated to match(es) played on 8 March 2018. Source: BIBL xscores
(D) Disqualified

== Quarterfinals ==
27 March 2018
18:30

Report

Tirana (Albania)	67–73	(Bulgaria) Levski
Scoring by quarter: 13–14, 23–11, 13–23, 18–25
Pts: Hysenagolli 23; Rebs: Shima 10; Asts: Shima 6		Pts: Milošević 24; Rebs: Marinov 9 Asts: Avramov, Marinov 4

Feti Borova, Tirana
Referees: Ognjen Jokić, Milosav Kaluđerović, Dardan Maxhuni

3 April 2018
19:30

Report

Levski (Bulgaria)	98–75	(Albania) Tirana
Scoring by quarter: 20–25, 27–12, 27–13, 24–25
Pts: Marinov 17; Rebs: Clanton 14; Asts: Avramov 6		Pts: Shima 20; Rebs: Shima 9 Asts: Shima 5

Universiada Hall, Sofia
Referees: Georgios Poursanidis, Dimitrios Bitis, Constantinos Poursanidis

Levski wins the series by 171–142

28 March 2018
18:30

Report

Bashkimi (Kosovo)	94–81	(Bulgaria) Academic Plovdiv
Scoring by quarter: 23–13, 28–23, 29–19, 14–26
Pts: Stutz 20; Rebs: Moss 8 Asts: Moss 12		Pts: Bachev 19; Rebs: Maravić 12; Asts: Durchev 9

Sezair Surroi, Prizren
Referees: Ognjen Jokić, Milosav Kaluđerović, Gilbert Hoxha

4 April 2018
18:30

Report

Academic Plovdiv (Bulgaria)	94–86	(Kosovo) Bashkimi
Scoring by quarter: 27-25, 18-19, 31-19, 18-23
Pts: Dimitrov 24; Rebs: Dimitrov 15; Asts: Umipig 7		Pts: Moss, Tmusic 23; Rebs: Moss 11; Asts: Moss 8

Kolodruma, Plovdiv
Referees: Georgios Poursanidis, Dimitrios Bitis, Constantinos Poursanidis

Bashkimi wins the series by 180–175

== Final Four ==
Semifinals
14 April
(Bulgaria) Rilski Sportist	71
(Kosovo) Bashkimi	72
14 April
(North Macedonia) Blokotehna	81
(Bulgaria) Levski	85

Final
15 April
(Kosovo) Bashkimi	72
(Bulgaria) Levski	83
Third place
15 April
(Bulgaria) Rilski Sportist	92
(North Macedonia) Blokotehna	79

=== Semifinals ===
14 April 2018
18:30

Report

Rilski Sportist (Bulgaria)	71–72	(Kosovo) Bashkimi

Arena Samokov, Samokov
Referees: Georgios Poursanidis, Ervin Koci, Aleksandar Davidov

14 April 2018
15:00

Blokotehna (North Macedonia)	81–85	(Bulgaria) Levski

Arena Samokov, Samokov
Referees: Ognjen Jokić, Daut Mehmeti, Dimitrios Bitis

=== Third place ===
15 April 2018

Rilski Sportist (Bulgaria)	92–79	(North Macedonia) Blokotehna

Arena Samokov, Samokov
Referees: Ognjen Jokić, Ervin Koci, Daut Mehmeti

=== Final ===
15 April 2018

Bashkimi (Kosovo)	72–83	(Bulgaria) Levski

Arena Samokov, Samokov
Referees: Georgios Poursanidis, Dimitrios Bitis, Aleksandar Davidov

2017–18 Balkan League champions

Levski Lukoil
3rd title
