= Yulian Radionov =

Bulgarian basketball player

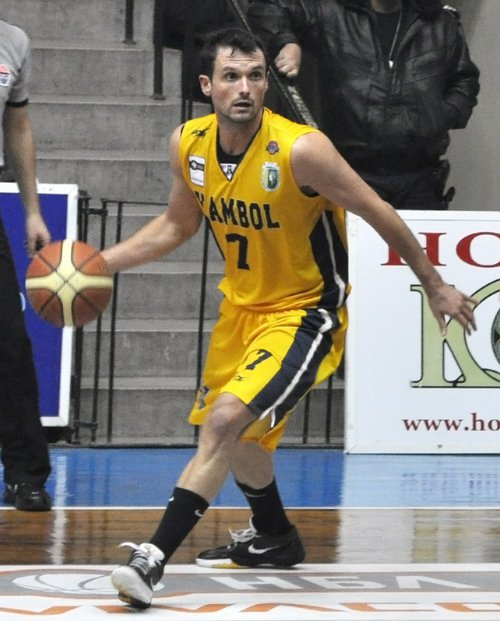

Personal information
- Born: 1 July 1979 (age 47) Burgas, Bulgaria
- Listed height: 6 ft 1.5 in (1.87 m)
- Listed weight: 178 lb (81 kg)

Career information
- Playing career: 1997–2013
- Position: Point guard
- Number: 7

Career history

Playing
- 1997–1998: BC Chernomorets
- 1998–2000: BC Spartak Pleven
- 2000–2001: Euroins Cherno More
- 2001–2005: Lukoil Academic
- 2005–2008: BC Levski Sofia
- 2008–2009: Euroins Cherno More,
- 2009–2013: BC Yambol

Coaching
- 2013–2015: BC Yambol

Yulian Radionov (Bulgarian: Юлиян Радионов) (born 1 July 1979) is a retired Bulgarian professional basketball player and former head coach of BC Yambol in the Bulgarian League. He was playing as a point guard. He is well known as Yuli among his team mates.

== Biography ==
Yuli was born in Burgas, and began his career on the local team - BC Chernomorets. He was a national player and one of the best point guards in Bulgaria and he played at EuroBasket 2005. Unfortunately, because of injuries he has missed a lot of matches for Bulgaria's national team.

After leaving BC Chernomorets he played for PBC Lukoil Academic, BC Levski Sofia, BC Spartak Pleven, Euroins Cherno More, and BC Yambol. He revived his career after signing with BC Yambol and became one of their leaders, playing alongside Dimitar Angelov and Stanislav Govedarov.

== 2009/2010 ==
He has played 35.1 minutes average per 30 games and made 2.5 steals(74 steals in total), which makes him the best stealer in NBL. His most memorable game in this season was in double overtime win (114-112) against Levski . For 50 minutes, without being substitute, his stats were 27 points, 6 rebounds and 7 assist.
