= 2025 Bulgarian Basketball Cup =

Bulgarian Basketball Cup
- Duration: 13 March 2025 – 16 March 2025
- Games played: 7
- Teams: 8
- TV partner: Max Sport

Regular season
- Season MVP: Stoyanov

Finals
- Champions: Cherno More
- Runners-up: Balkan Botevgrad
- Semi-finalists: Spartak Pleven; Rilski Sportist
- Finals MVP: Stoyanov

Statistical leaders
- Points: Schwartz 23
- Rebounds: Marshall 11.67
- Assists: Toshkov 11

Records
- Highest attendance: 2,700
- Lowest attendance: 230
- Average attendance: 1,190

The 2025 Bulgarian Basketball Cup was the 71st edition of the annual cup tournament in Bulgaria. It is managed by the Bulgarian Basketball Federation and is the first event being held at the new Arena Samelyon in Samokov. The competition began on 13 March 2025 with the quarterfinals, and ended with the final on 16 March 2025. MVP of the tournament and the final game, was Stoyanov from Cherno More

== Qualified teams ==
The first eight teams qualified after the first stage of the 2024–25 NBL regular season.

Pos	Team	Pld	W	L	Seed
1	Rilski Sportist	16	14	2	Seeded teams
2	Balkan Botevgrad	16	12	4	Seeded teams
3	Cherno More	16	9	7	Seeded teams
4	Spartak Pleven	16	9	7	Seeded teams
5	Beroe	16	9	7	Non-seeded Teams
6	Academic Plovdiv	16	8	8	Non-seeded Teams
7	Minyor 2015	16	7	9	Non-seeded Teams
8	Levski	16	2	14	Non-seeded Teams
9	Shumen	16	2	14	Did not qualify

== Draw ==
The draw for the 2025 Bulgarian Basketball Cup took place on 5 March 2025. The seeded teams were paired in the quarterfinals with the non-seeded teams. There were no restrictions for the semifinals draw.

== Bracket ==
Quarterfinals
4	Spartak Pleven	88
7	Minyor 2015	76
3	Cherno More Ticha	88
5	Beroe	84
1	Rilski Sportist	90
6	Academic Plovdiv	81
2	Balkan Botevgrad	88
8	Levski	65

Semifinals
Spartak Pleven	66
Cherno More Ticha	84
Rilski Sportist	83
Balkan Botevgrad	94

Final
Cherno More Ticha	88
Balkan Botevgrad	81

== Quarterfinals ==
13 March	Spartak Pleven	88–76	Minyor 2015	Arena Samelyon
13:00 (UTC+02)
Max Sport 2	Pts: Hollowell 17; Rebs: Kesar, Zahariev 7 Asts: Keeling 8 PIR: Keeling 19	Boxscore	Pts: Schwartz 23; Rebs: Schwartz 9 Asts: Toshkov 11; PIR: Schwartz 31	Attendance: 230; Referees: Kaloyan Kostov

13 March	Cherno More Ticha	88–84	Beroe	Arena Samelyon
15:30 (UTC+02)
Max Sport 2	Pts: Stoyanov,Scott 17; Rebs: Stoyanov,Florveus 8 Asts: Smith 6 PIR: Stoyanov 30	Boxscore	Pts: Petkov 19; Rebs: Walker 7 Asts: Petkov 6 PIR: Petkov 22	Attendance: 250; Referees: Slavcho Nuchev

13 March	Rilski Sportist	90–81	Academic Plovdiv	Arena Samelyon
18:30 (UTC+02)
Max Sport 2	Pts: Kostov 19; Rebs: Simeonov 7 Asts: Hannah 7 PIR: Hannah 25	Boxscore	Pts: Kikrilis 17; Rebs: Tomić,Williams 7 Asts: Williams 7 PIR: Tomić,Williams 18	Attendance: 2,000; Referees: Ivan Marinov

13 March	Balkan Botevgrad	83–65	Levski	Arena Samelyon
21:00 (UTC+02)
Max Sport 2	Pts: Boyanov 14; Rebs: Marshall 17; Asts: Toshkov 4 PIR: Marshall 25	Boxscore	Pts: Mladenov 21; Rebs: Mladenov 7 Asts: Georgiev 4 PIR: Mladenov 22	Attendance: 450; Referees: Nikolay Tsintsarski

== Semifinals ==
15 March	Spartak Pleven	66–84	Cherno More Ticha	Arena Samelyon
16:00 (UTC+02)
Max Sport 2	Pts: Bracey, Kesar 15; Rebs: Lepichev 10; Asts: Bracey 5 PIR: Kesar 15	Boxscore	Pts: Scott 19; Rebs: Smith 13; Asts: Scott 8 PIR: Smith 26	Attendance: 700

15 March	Rilski Sportist	83–94	Balkan Botevgrad	Arena Samelyon
19:00 (UTC+02)
Max Sport 2	Pts: Hannah 25; Rebs: Arnett 13; Asts: Planinic 4 PIR: Arnett 23	Boxscore	Pts: Boyanov 19; Rebs: Marshall 8 Asts: Toshkov 3 PIR: Boyanov 25	Attendance: 2,700

== Finals ==
16 March 2024	Cherno More Ticha	89–81	Balkan Botevgrad	Arena Samelyon
17:00 (UTC+02)
	Pts: Stoyanov,Scott 23; Rebs: Smith, Scott 9 Asts: Smith 4 PIR: Stoyanov 29	Boxscore	Pts: Marshall 18; Rebs: Boyanov, Marshall 10; Asts: five players 2 PIR: Marshall 23	Attendance: 2,000; Referees: Ventsislav Velikov, Martin Horozov, Kaloyan Kostov
