= 2022 Bulgarian Basketball Cup =

Bulgarian Basketball Cup
- Duration: 24 March 2022 – 28 March 2022
- Games played: 7
- Teams: 8
- TV partner(s): Max Sport

Regular season
- Season MVP: Ivanov

Finals
- Champions: Rilski Sportist
- Runners-up: Levski
- Semifinalists: Balkan Botevgrad, Beroe

Statistical leaders
- Points: Boyanov 29.0
- Rebounds: Boyanov 16.0
- Assists: Burns 6.0

Records
- Highest scoring: Chernomorets 98–102 Beroe (24 March 2022)

The 2022 Bulgarian Basketball Cup is the 68th edition of the annual cup tournament in Bulgaria. It is managed by the Bulgarian Basketball Federation and will be held in Botevgrad, Arena Botevgrad. The competition starts at 24 March 2022, with the quarterfinals and ended with the Final on March 28, 2021.

== Qualified teams ==
The first eight teams qualified after the first stage of the 2021–22 NBL regular season.

Pos	Team	Pld	W	L	Seed
1	Rilski Sportist	18	16	2	Seeded teams
2	Balkan Botevgrad	18	14	4	Seeded teams
3	Levski Lukoil	18	12	6	Seeded teams
4	Chernomorets	18	11	7	Seeded teams
5	Spartak Pleven	18	10	8	Non-seeded Teams
6	Beroe	18	10	8	Non-seeded Teams
7	Academic Bultex 99	18	8	10	Non-seeded Teams
8	Yambol	18	6	12	Non-seeded Teams
9	Shumen	18	2	16	Did not qualify
10	Cherno More Ticha	18	1	17	Did not qualify

== Draw ==
The 2021 Bulgarian Basketball Cup was drawn on 8 March 2022 at approximately 12:00. The seeded teams were paired in the quarterfinals with the non-seeded teams. There were not any restrictions for the draw of the semifinals.

== Bracket ==
Quarterfinals
Chernomorets	98
Beroe	102
Rilski Sportist	93
Bultex 99	69
Levski Lukoil	91
Spartak Pleven	70
Balkan Botevgrad	90
Yambol	79

Semifinals
Beroe	71
Rilski Sportist	99
Levski Lukoil	74
Balkan Botevgrad	73

Final
Rilski Sportist	92
Levski Lukoil	86

== Quarterfinals ==
24 March	Rilski Sportist	93–69	Academic Plovdiv	Arena Botevgrad
20:00(UTC+02)	Scoring by quarter: 26-19, 20-19, 32-11, 15-20
		Boxscore

24 March	Chernomorets	98–102	Beroe	Arena Botevgrad
17:00(UTC+02)	Scoring by quarter: 20-21, 15-20, 22-22, 27-21
Max Sport 2		Boxscore

25 March	Levski Lukoil	91–70	Spartak Pleven	Arena Botevgrad
17:00(UTC+02)	Scoring by quarter: 23-15, 25-17, 35-21, 8-17
Max Sport 2		Boxscore

25 March	Balkan Botevgrad	90–79	Yambol	Arena Botevgrad
20:00(UTC+02)	Scoring by quarter: 23-19, 21-15, 20-26, 26-19
		Boxscore

== Semifinals ==
26 March	Rilski Sportist	99–71	Beroe	Arena Botevgrad
17:00(UTC+02)	Scoring by quarter: 30-19, 19-23, 28-23, 22-6
Max Sport 2		Boxscore

26 March	Balkan Botevgrad	73–74	Levski Lukoil	Arena Botevgrad
20:00(UTC+02)	Scoring by quarter: 17-21, 17-20, 19-12, 20-21
Max Sport 2		Boxscore

== Finals ==
28 March 2022	Rilski Sportist	92–86	Levski Lukoil	Arena Botevgrad
19:00	Scoring by quarter: 28-30, 17-23, 22-16, 25-17
	Pts: Brown 28; Rebs: Simeonov 10; Asts: Brown 6 PIR: Brown 32	Boxscore	Pts: Little 30; Rebs: Radic 8 Asts: Dimitrov 4 PIR: Little 28
