= 2015 Bulgarian Basketball Cup =

Bulgarian basketball competition

Tournament details
- Arena: Balkanstroy Hall; Pleven
- Dates: 19–22 February 2015

Final positions
- Champions: Cherno More Port Varna (4th title)
- Runners-up: Lukoil Academic

Awards and statistics
- MVP: (Bulgaria) Stanimir Marinov

The 2015 Bulgarian Basketball Cup was the 61st edition of the annual cup tournament in Bulgaria. It was managed by the Bulgarian Basketball Federation and was held in Pleven, in the Balkanstory Hall on February 19–22, 2015. Cherno More Port Varna won their 4th cup. Stanimir Marinov was named MVP.

== Qualified teams ==
The first seven teams after the first stage of the 2014–15 NBL regular season and Spartak Pleven as a host qualified for the tournament.

Pos	Team	Pld	W	L	Seed
1	Lukoil Academic	16	15	1	Seeded Teams
2	Balkan Botevgrad	16	12	4	Seeded Teams
3	Levski Sofia	16	11	5	Seeded Teams
4	Rilski Sportist	16	10	6	Seeded Teams
5	Cherno More Port Varna	16	9	7	Non-Seeded Teams
6	Beroe	16	7	9	Non-Seeded Teams
7	Yambol	16	6	10	Non-Seeded Teams
9	Spartak Pleven (H)	16	0	16	Non-Seeded Teams

== Bracket ==
Quarterfinals
Lukoil Academic	92
Beroe	68
Levski Sofia	70
Yambol	75
Balkan Botevgrad	75
Cherno More Varna	81
Rilski Sportist	88
Spartak Pleven	66

Semifinals
Lukoil Academic	105
Yambol	56
Cherno More Varna	75
Rilski Sportist	73

Final
Lukoil Academic	69
Cherno More Varna	72
Third place
Yambol	69
Rilski Sportist	74
