= Nikolay Varbanov =

Bulgarian basketball player

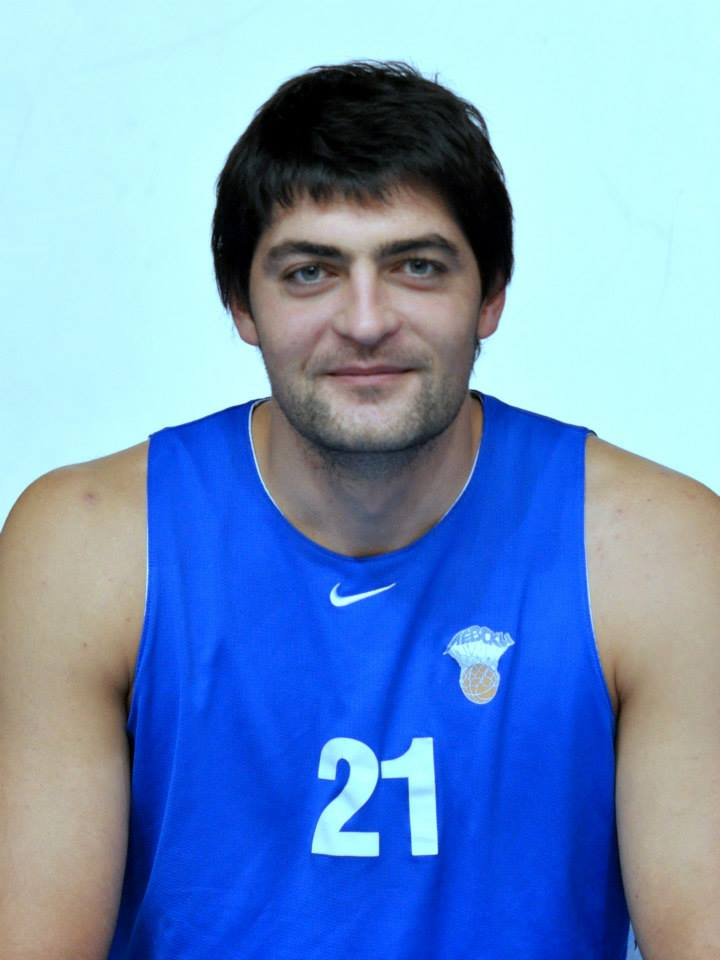

Personal information
- Born: June 6, 1985 (age 41) Lyaskovec, Bulgaria
- Listed height: 6 ft 10 1/4 in (2.09 m)
- Listed weight: 246 lb (112 kg)

Career information
- Playing career: 2002–2019
- Position: Center

Career history
- 2003–2008: Levski Sofia
- 2009–2010: Lukoil Academic
- 2010–2011: Yambol
- 2011–2012: BC Kalev
- 2012–2014: Levski Sofia
- 2014–2016: Balkan Botevgrad
- 2016–2018: Yambol
- 2018–2019: Spartak Pleven

Nikolay Varbanov (Bulgarian: Николай Върбанов; born June 6, 1985) is a Bulgarian former professional basketball player. He played the center position. He stands 2.09 m in height. Varbanov was a member of Bulgaria national basketball team.

== Awards and achievements ==
- Bulgarian Cup Semifinals -04, 08, 11
- Bulgarian League Semifinals -04, 06, 08, 11
- Bulgarian U20 National Team -05
- European Championships U20 Div.B in Varna -05 (Champion): 8 games: 4.4ppg, 3.3rpg
- Bulgarian National Team -05-07, 08, 10–11–13
- Bulgarian League All-Star Game -07, 11
- Bulgarian Cup Finalist -07, 09, 13
- Bulgarian League Regular Season Runner-Up -08
- Bulgarian League Regular Season Champion -09, 10
- Bulgarian League Champion -09, 10
- Bulgarian University National Team -09
- European Championships in Lithuania -11: 5 games: 2.8ppg, 2.4rpg
- Estonian Cup Finalist -12
