= 2017 Bulgarian Basketball Cup =

Basketball tournament in Bulgaria

Tournament details
- Arena: Kolodruma Hall; Plovdiv
- Dates: 16–19 February 2017

Final positions
- Champions: Beroe (1st title)
- Runners-up: Lukoil Academic

Awards and statistics
- MVP: (United States) Travis Daniels

The 2017 Bulgarian Basketball Cup was the 63rd edition of the annual cup tournament in Bulgaria.It is managed by the Bulgarian Basketball Federation and was held in Plovdiv, in the Kolodruma Hall on February 16–19, 2017. Beroe won their 1st cup. Travis Daniels was named Tournament MVP and Aaron Jones was named Final MVP.

== Qualified teams ==
The first eight teams qualified after the first stage of the 2016-17 NBL regular season .

Pos	Team	Pld	W	L	Seed
1	Lukoil Academic	16	13	3	Seeded Teams
2	Academic Bultex 99 (H)	16	11	5	Seeded Teams
3	Beroe	16	10	6	Seeded Teams
4	Rilski Sportist	16	9	7	Seeded Teams
5	Balkan Botevgrad	16	9	7	Non-Seeded Teams
6	Spartak Pleven	16	8	8	Non-Seeded Teams
7	Cherno More Ticha	16	5	11	Non-Seeded Teams
8	Yambol	16	4	12	Non-Seeded Teams

== Bracket ==
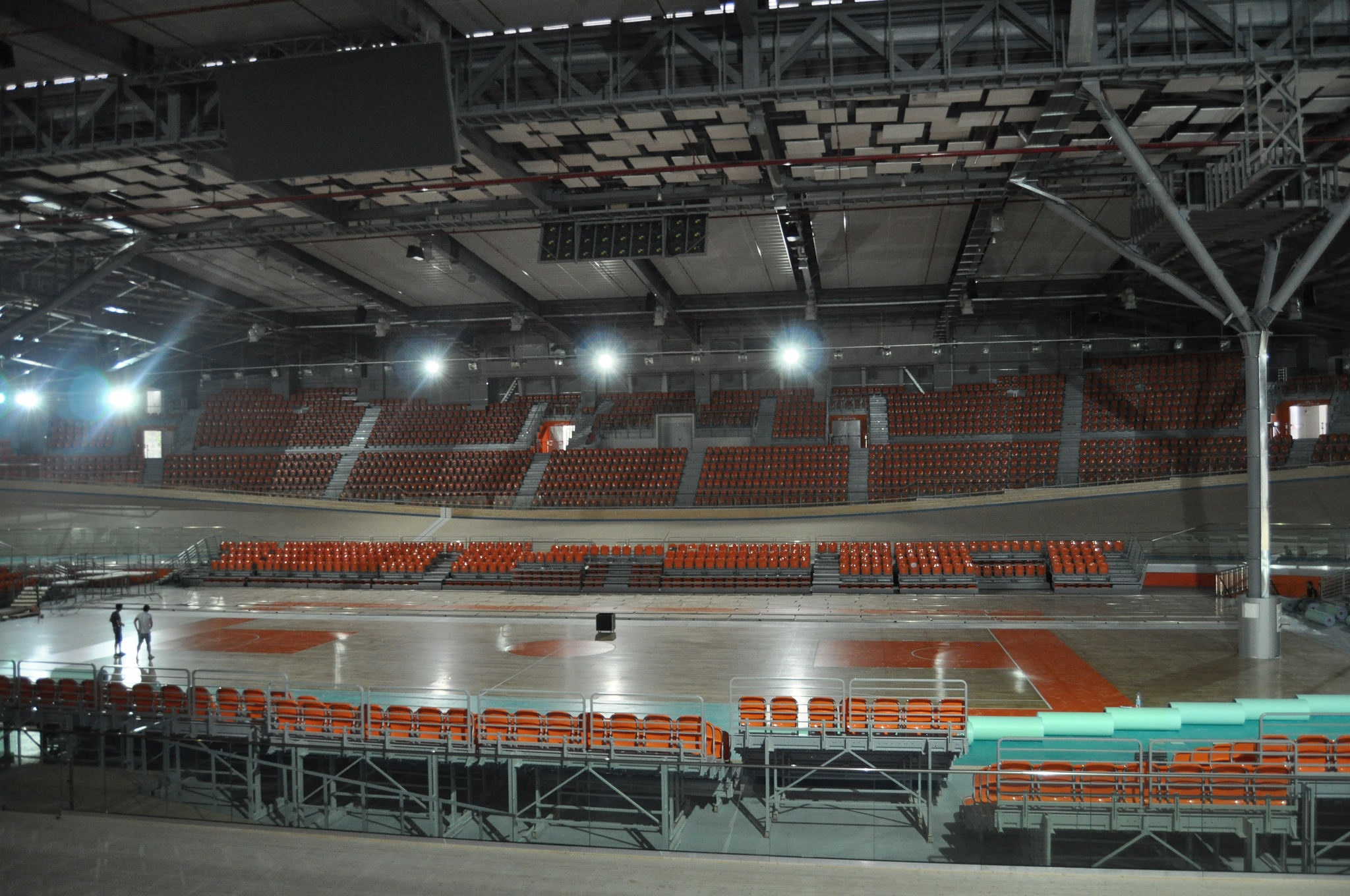
Koludruma

Quarterfinals
Lukoil Academic	76
Yambol	44
Rilski Sportist	68
Balkan Botevgrad	81
Beroe	69
Cherno More Ticha	58
Academic Bultex 99	68
Spartak Pleven	59

Semifinals
Lukoil Academic	80
Balkan Botevgrad	79
Beroe	83
Academic Bultex 99	65

Final
Lukoil Academic	62
Beroe	78
Third place
Balkan Botevgrad	83
Academic Bultex 99	62
