= Hristo Nikolov (basketball) =

Bulgarian basketball player (born 1985)

Personal information
- Born: 2 October 1985 (age 41) Burgas, Bulgaria
- Listed height: 2.00 m (6 ft 7 in)
- Listed weight: 108 kg (238 lb)

Career information
- College: Casper College (2004–2006)
- NBA draft: 2007: undrafted
- Playing career: 2002–present
- Position: Forward

Career history
- 2002–2008: CSKA Sofia
- 2008–2010: Lukoil Academic
- 2010–2011: Steaua București
- 2011–2012: Szolnoki Olaj
- 2012–2013: U-Mobitelco Cluj-Napoca
- 2013–2014: Élan Béarnais Pau-Orthez
- 2014–2015: Union Olimpija
- 2015: Levski Sofia
- 2015–2017: Stal Ostrów Wielkopolski
- 2017–2018: Lukoil Academic
- 2018: Levski Lukoil
- 2018–2019: Chernomorets

Career highlights
- 3× Bulgarian champion (2009, 2010, 2018); Bulgarian Cup winner (2005); Hungarian champion (2012); Hungarian Cup winner (2012)

Hristo Yanchev Nikolov (Bulgarian: Христо Янчев Николов; born October 2, 1985) is a Bulgarian professional basketball player and a captain of the Bulgaria national basketball team. He last played for Chernomoret of the NBL.

== Player profile ==
Often called by his nickname Glarusa (the Gull), Hristo Nikolov has a strong body structure and masculine built. He is 6 feet 6 inches (1.98 m) tall and weighs 238 pounds (108 kg). Nikolov primary plays as a small forward and power forward, even though he is versatile in other positions on the court. Known for his quick first step and strong perimeter shooting, Hristo shows his abilities on offense and an excellent defensive end. When he plays as a point guard, he averages 5.4 assist. He has a solid vertical, good court vision and reads well passing lines.

== Professional career ==
=== PBC CSKA Sofia (Aug 2003 – Jun 2005), Bulgaria ===
Nikolov's first professional basketball appearance happened with PBC CSKA Sofia, after he was accepted at the age of 16. Despite his young age, at the time he participated in the Bulgarian's edition of the basketball All-Star game, became a cup holder in the National Basketball League and ended the season in second place in the championship.

=== Casper College (Aug 2004 – Jan 2006), U.S. ===
After two successful years playing in the men's league for CSKA Sofia, Hristo Nikolov won a scholarship and left Bulgaria to participate in a basketball program, provided by Casper College in Casper, Wyoming, United States. There he was introduced to American basketball traditions. Nikolov was among the team leaders, where he averaged 19.00 ppg.

=== PBC CSKA Sofia (Jan 2006 – Jun 2008), Bulgaria ===
Once his scholarship program was over, Hristo Nikolov returned to Bulgaria and immediately signed with his old club – CSKA Sofia. He participated in the AllStar game and quickly established himself a reputation as a hard-working and skilled player. He showed leadership qualities and was often among the playmakers in the team. Nikolov averaged 14 points, 5.3 rebounds and 3.3 assists in 45 Bulgarian League contests.

=== Lukoil Academic (Aug 2008 – Jan 2010), Bulgaria ===
Nikolov was spotted by a basketball club in the local league – PBC Lukoil Academic. He became a two-time champion of Bulgaria. Nikolov also participated in the AllStar game and the Eurocup.

=== Steaua București (Aug 2010 – Jun 2011), Romania ===
After his two-year contract with Lukoil Academic had expired, Hristo Nikolov signed with the 21 championships winner Steaua București and immediately became a leader on the court. With his help the club reached the Romanian cup finals and finished in 3rd place in the Championship. Nikolov participated in the Eurochallenge contest.

=== Szolnoki Olaj KK (Aug 2011 – May 2013), Hungary ===
Nikolov's great season at Steaua Bucuresti brought him to the attention of the Hungarian basketball experts and shortly after the annual break, Hristo signed with 5-time Hungarian Championship and 5-time Hungarian Cup holder Szolnoki Olaj KK. With Szolnoki Nikolov won the Super Cup, reached the final four of the EuroChallenge contest in Debrecen, participated in the local AllStar game and held the MVP title of the Championship.

=== National Team of Bulgaria (Jul 2012 – Sept 2012), Eurobasket ===
The past few seasons brought Hristo Nikolov to a forefront as one of the most promising playmakers for the upcoming Eurobasket challenge. At that time, the Bulgarian National Basketball Team was under the coaching of Rosen Barchovski and assistant coaches Ivan Cholakov and Ludmil Hadjisotirov. The team reached the qualifications round, but did not go further.

=== "U" MOBITELCO (Aug 2012 – May 2013), Romania ===
After becoming champion with his Hungarian team, Hristo was transferred back in Romania, but this time as a player of U-Mobitelco Cluj-Napoca. The Romanian team reached finals of the Romanian cup tournament. Nikolov participated in the Romanian AllStar game.

=== Élan Béarnais Pau-Orthez (Aug 2013 – May 2014), France ===
Hristo Nikolov was noticed by the French Pro A League experts. In August 2013 he signed his contract for the French professional basketball club Élan Béarnais Pau-Orthez.

=== Olimpija Ljubljana (Aug 2014 - 2015), Slovenia ===
Hristo Nikolov had a successful season, playing for the Slovenian professional basketball club Olimpija Ljubljana, which competes in Eurocup, Premier A Slovenian Basketball League and the Adriatic League.

=== BC Levski (February 2015 - December 2015), Bulgaria ===
After having played abroad for several years, Hristo Nikolov came back to Bulgaria to join the Bulgarian BC Levski Sofia until he signed with the Polish Stal Ostrów Wielkopolski.

=== Stal Ostrów Wielkopolski (December 2015 - present) ===
Hristo joined the Polish Stal Ostrów Wielkopolski on 10 December 2015. Nikolov is currently among the starting five, playing the position of a power forward. The team competes in the Polish Basketball League.

On 13 May 2016, Nikolov signed a one-year contract extension with Stal Ostrów.

== Early life and education ==
Hristo Nikolov was born in Burgas, Bulgaria on October 2, 1985. He was introduced to basketball after joining the local basketball club "Dolphin" in 1997. Shortly after that in 2000, at the age of 16, Nikolov was transferred to the professional basketball club CSKA – Sofia where his professional career in basketball began. He has an education in Agribusiness & Rural development.

== Off court ==
Hristo Nikolov is known for his entrepreneurial spirit, business ventures and conclusive support for a variety of charity causes and organizations. He currently owns a website on Bulgarian basketball(http://bball.bg).
