= Bulgarian Basketball Super Cup =

Basketball competition in Bulgaria

- Current season, competition or edition: 2026 Bulgarian Basketball Super Cup
- Founded: 2016
- No. of teams: 2
- Country: Bulgaria
- Confederation: FIBA Europe
- Most recent champions: Balkan Botevgrad (1st title)
- Most titles: BC Levski Sofia; Rilski Sportist (3 titles)
- Related competitions: NBL; Bulgarian Cup
- Website: nbl.basketball.bg

The Bulgarian Basketball Super Cup is an annual cup competition, organized by the Bulgarian Basketball Federation since 2016. BC Levski Sofia is the all-time record holder with 3 titles.

== Title holders ==
- 2016 Academic Sofia
- 2017 Beroe
- 2018 Levski Sofia
- 2019 Levski Sofia
- 2021 Rilski Sportist
- 2022 Rilski Sportist
- 2023 Levski Sofia
- 2024 Rilski Sportist
- 2025 Cherno More
- 2026 Balkan Botevgrad

== Recent finals ==
Season	Champions	Score	Runners-Up
2016	Academic Sofia	93–85	Rilski Sportist
2017	Beroe	86–85	Academic Sofia
2018	Levski Sofia	102–80	Rilski Sportist
2019	Levski Sofia	82–71	Balkan Botevgrad
2021	Rilski Sportist	91–85	Levski Sofia
2022	Rilski Sportist	70–60	Balkan Botevgrad
2023	Levski Sofia	57–56	Balkan Botevgrad
2024	Rilski Sportist	95–76	Spartak Pleven
2025	Cherno More	84–66	Rilski Sportist
2026	Balkan Botevgrad	94–71	Cherno More

== Titles by team ==
Team	Winners	Winning years
Levski Sofia	3	2018, 2019, 2023
Rilski Sportist	3	2021, 2022, 2024
Academic Sofia	1	2016
Beroe	1	2017
Cherno More	1	2025
Balkan Botevgrad	1	2026
