= Stanimir Marinov =

Bulgarian basketball player

No. 23 – Spartak
- Position: Point guard / shooting guard
- League: NBL

Personal information
- Born: September 7, 1991 (age 34) Silistra, Bulgaria
- Listed height: 6 ft 4 in (1.93 m)
- Listed weight: 193 lb (88 kg)

Career information
- Playing career: 2009–present

Career history
- 2009–2014: Balkan
- 2014: Levski
- 2015: Euroins Cherno More
- 2015–2016: Sigal Prishtina
- 2016–2017: Balkan
- 2017: Cherkaski Mavpy
- 2017–2018: Levski Lukoil
- 2018–2019: U-BT Cluj-Napoca
- 2019: UJAP Quimper 29
- 2020: Beroe
- 2020–2022: Balkan
- 2022–present: Spartak

Career highlights
- Bulgarian League champion (2018); Kosovar League champion (2016); Kosovar Cup champion (2016); Bulgarian Cup (2015); Bulgarian Cup MVP (2015)

Stanimir Marinov (Bulgarian: Станимир Маринов; born 7 September 1991) is a Bulgarian professional basketball player. He currently plays for Spartak of the Bulgarian National Basketball League.

== Bulgarian national team ==
Marinov is a member of Bulgarian national team. He appeared for his country's team six times during the EuroBasket 2015 Second Qualifying Round, where he averaged 23.5 minutes, 2.7 assists, 2.5 rebounds and 1 steal per game.
