= 2016 Bulgarian Basketball Cup =

Tournament details
- Arena: Arena Botevgrad; Botevgrad
- Dates: 18–21 February 2016

Final positions
- Champions: Rilski Sportist (1st title)
- Runners-up: Lukoil Academic

Awards and statistics
- MVP: (United States) Tony Gugino

The 2016 Bulgarian Basketball Cup was the 62nd edition of the annual cup tournament in Bulgaria.It is managed by the Bulgarian Basketball Federation and was held in Botevgrad, in the Arena Botevgrad on February 18–21, 2016. Rilski Sportist won their 1st cup. Tony Gugino was named MVP.

== Qualified teams ==
The first eight teams qualified after the first stage of the 2015–16 NBL regular season .

Pos	Team	Pld	W	L	Seed
1	Lukoil Academic	18	17	1	Seeded Teams
2	Balkan Botevgrad (H)	18	15	3	Seeded Teams
3	Rilski Sportist	18	12	6	Seeded Teams
4	Beroe	18	12	6	Seeded Teams
5	Cherno More Port Varna	18	10	8	Non-Seeded Teams
6	Spartak Pleven	18	9	9	Non-Seeded Teams
7	Levski Sofia	18	6	12	Non-Seeded Teams
8	Yambol	18	4	14	Non-Seeded Teams

== Bracket ==
Quarterfinals
Lukoil Academic	88
Levski Sofia	72
Balkan Botevgrad	105
Cherno More Port Varna	80
Rilski Sportist	79
Yambol	68
Beroe	109
Spartak Pleven	100

Semifinals
Lukoil Academic	85
Balkan Botevgrad	68
Rilski Sportist	80
Beroe	71

Final
Lukoil Academic	80
Rilski Sportist	90
Third place
Balkan Botevgrad	59
Beroe	71
