= Pavel Ivanov =

Bulgarian basketball player

Personal information
- Born: February 26, 1988 (age 38) Tutrakan, Bulgaria
- Listed height: 2.00 m (6 ft 7 in)
- Listed weight: 90 kg (198 lb)

Career information
- NBA draft: 2010: undrafted
- Playing career: 2005–present
- Position: Shooting guard / small forward

Career history
- 2005–2015: Levski Sofia
- 2015–2016: Estudiantes de Bahía Blanca
- 2016–2017: Levski Sofia
- 2017–2019: Balkan

Pavel Ivanov (Bulgarian: Павел Иванов; born 26 February 1988) is a Bulgarian professional basketball player who plays for Balkan of the Bulgarian League. Standing at 2.00 m (6 ft 6 1/2 in), he plays as a swingman.
