= BC Yambol =

Bulgarian basketball club

Yambol
- Leagues: NBL
- Founded: 1945; 81 years ago
- Arena: Diana Hall
- Capacity: 1,800
- Location: Yambol, Bulgaria
- Team colors: Yellow and Blue
- President: Valentin Revanski
- Head coach: Todor Todorov
- Championships: 1 Bulgarian Championship
- Website: yambolbasketball.com
Home	Away

BC Yambol (Bulgarian: БК „Ямбол“) is a Bulgarian professional basketball club based in Yambol. Founded in 1945, Yambol has won the Bulgarian championship once as Yambolgas. They play their home matches at the Diana Hall. The team is a regular first league participant. Former names of the club are Luskov, Tundja, Yambolen and Yambolgas.

== History ==
Founded in 1945, the club joined the third edition of the Bulgarian Championship to become the first participant of this basketball championship based outside of the capital Sofia.

In 1976, the club, as "Luskov"-Yambol, appointed Simeon Varchev as new head coach, who work there until 1980. He recruit some new young players including Georgi Glouchkov, the first bulgarian played in NBA. In 1977, they won the first medal for the club, third place in the Bulgarian Cup and in 1979 the bronze medal in Bulgarian Championship. In 1980, Georgi Glouchkov moved to PBC CSKA Sofia, captain of the team Ivan Angelov retired, and even though Varchev and Ivan Glavov (one of the leading playmakers in league the time) stayed, the club relegated in to the second tier.

Yambol stayed there until 1992, when it got promoted and since then remains in the top flight. The coach of the club was Ivan Cholakov, who was team head coach in two periods- 1989-2002 and 2004-2013. In 2002, with the name of Yambolgas by sponsorship reasons, the club won the Bulgarian Championship after winning to Lukoil Academic by 3–0 in the final series. After 29 years in the top flight, Yambol withdrew from NBL, due to financial difficulties, as well as the reconstruction of their Diana arena and the lack of an available alternative basketball hall. They participate in the second division for the 2024–25 season, mainly with players from their academy, and confirmed their intention of returning to the NBL for the 2025–26 season. On 19 June 2026 Yambol officially submitted their application documents for the 2026–27 NBL, after two years in the second tier and completion of the renovation of their Sports Hall Diana .

== Honours ==
- Bulgarian Championship
  - Winners (1): 2002
  - Runners-up (1): 2001
  - Bronze medalist (5): 1979, 2000, 2003, 2011, 2012
- Bulgarian Cup
  - Bronze medalist (4): 1977, 2000, 2001, 2002

== Roster 2026-2027 ==
Note: Flags indicate national team eligibility at FIBA-sanctioned events. Players may hold other non-FIBA nationalities not displayed.

BC Yambol roster
Players
Coaches

Pos.	No.	Nat.	Name	Ht.	Wt.	Age
C	9	(Bulgaria)	Vachev, Andon	2.05 m (6 ft 9 in)		23 – 17 August 2003
F	77	(Bulgaria)	Kolev, Jeremy	1.96 m (6 ft 5 in)		21 – 7 July 2005
SF	28	(Turkey)	Akman, Enes	1.97 m (6 ft 6 in)		19 – 18 July 2007
PG	45	(Bulgaria)	Penev, Kaloyan	1.83 m (6 ft 0 in)		22 – 30 September 2004
SG	24	(Bulgaria)	Nankov, Nikola	1.82 m (6 ft 0 in)	76 kg (168 lb)	19 – 19 May 2007
PF	10	(United States)	Taylor, Josh	2.03 m (6 ft 8 in)		24 – 11 November 2001
PG	1	(United States)	Young, Jayhlon	1.88 m (6 ft 2 in)		25 – 30 September 2001
SG	13	(Bulgaria)	Mehmed, Berk	1.97 m (6 ft 6 in)		24 – 9 September 2002
SG	0	(United States)	Hardy, CJ	1.91 m (6 ft 3 in)		23 – 8 May 2003

Head coach

- (Bulgaria) Todor Todorov

Legend

- (C) Team captain
- Injured

- Roster
Updated: 19 August 2026

== In Europe ==
BC Yambol played in FIBA Korać Cup (2000, 2001), FIBA Europe Champions Cup for Men 2003/Conference South and NEBL Open 2001/2002.

=== 1999–2000 FIBA Korać Cup ===
Round	Team	Home	Away
Additional Preliminary Round	(Turkey) Karşıyaka Basket	62–54	59–81

=== 2000–01 FIBA Korać Cup ===
Round	Team	Home	Away
Elimination Round I	(North Macedonia) KK Kumanovo	104–78	82–80
Elimination Round II	(Serbia) KK FMP	65–67	62–75

=== 2002–03 FIBA Europe Champions Cup ===
Round	Team	Home	Away
Group Stage (Conference South)	(Greece) Peristeri B.C.	66–72	68–93
Group Stage (Conference South)	(Israel) Hapoel Jerusalem B.C.	76–70	71–97
Group Stage (Conference South)	(Serbia) KK Vojvodina Srbijagas	97–91	85–72
Group Stage (Conference South)	(Turkey) Karşıyaka Basket	82–69	72–78
Group Stage (Conference South)	(North Macedonia) KK Rabotnički	85–73	69–75

== Season by season ==
Season	Tier	Division	Pos.	Postseason	RS	PO	Bulgarian Cup
1992–93	1	A-1	8	Quarterfinalist	2–12	0-2	Fourth
1993–94	1	A-1	12	R16	12–18	0-2	
1994–95	2	A-2					
1995–96	1	A-1	7	Quarterfinalist	9–13	1-2	First round
1996–97	1	A-1	8	Quarterfinalist	9–13	0-2	
1997–98	1	A-1	7	Quarterfinalist	10–12	1-2	
1998–99	1	A-1	4	Fourth	14–8	3-6	Fourth
1999–00	1	A-1	3	Third	20–8	6-5	Third
2000–01	1	A-1	2	Runner-up	23–5	5-4	Third
2001–02	1	A-1	1	Champion	23–5	8–1	Third
2002–03	1	A-1	3	Third	21–7	5–4	Fourth
2003–04	1	A-1	7	Quarterfinalist	8-20	2–2	Quarterfinalist
2004–05	1	A-1	5	Quarterfinalist	12–16	3–2	Quarterfinalist
2005–06	1	A-1	3	Fourth	13–13	2–6	Fourth
2006–07	1	A-1	7	Quarterfinalist	7–11	0–2	Quarterfinalist
2007–08	1	A-1	7	Quarterfinalist	11–21	2–3	Quarterfinalist
2008–09	1	NBL	6	Quarterfinalist	7–17	1–2	First round
2009–10	1	NBL	4	Quarterfinalist	14–14	1–2	Quarterfinalist
2010–11	1	NBL	6	Third	10–18	4–3	Fourth
2011–12	1	NBL	3	Third	18–10	5–4	Fourth
2012–13	1	NBL	5	Quarterfinalist	13–14	1-2	Fourth
2013–14	1	NBL	5	Quarterfinalist	13–11	0–2	Quarterfinalist
2014–15	1	NBL	7	Quarterfinalist	8–16	1–2	Fourth
2015–16	1	NBL	8	Quarterfinalist	7-20	0-2	Quarterfinalist
2016–17	1	NBL	8	Quarterfinalist	7-17	0-2	Quarterfinalist
2017–18	1	NBL	7	Quarterfinalist	8-16	1-2	Quarterfinalist
2018–19	1	NBL	7	Quarterfinalist	8-16	0-2	Quarterfinalist
2019–20	1	NBL	10	Canceled	2-17		DNQ
2020–21	1	NBL	7	Quarterfinalist	9-15	0-2	Semifinalist
2021–22	1	NBL	8	Quarterfinalist	9-18	0-2	Quarterfinalist
2022-23	1	NBL	9	DNQ	9-21	DNQ	Quarterfinalist
2023-24	1	NBL	10	DNQ	12-20	DNQ	Quarterfinalist
2024-25	2	BBL					DNQ
2025-26	2	BBL					DNQ
2026-27	1	NBL					

== Notable players ==
- (Bulgaria) Georgi Glouchkov
- (Bulgaria) Dimitar Angelov
- (Bulgaria) Georgi Stankov
- (Bulgaria) Valcho Yordanov
- (Bulgaria) Ivan Angelov
- (Bulgaria) Ivan Glavov
- (Bulgaria) Geno Plachkov
- (Bulgaria) Dimitar Dimitrov
- (Bulgaria) Georgi Kovachev
- (Bulgaria) Emil Stamenov
- (Bulgaria) Stanislav Govedarov
- (Bulgaria) Dimitar Horozov
- (Bulgaria) Decho Koeshinov
- (Bulgaria) Rumen Shopov
- (Bulgaria) Martin Durchev
- (Bulgaria) Pavel Marinov
- (Bulgaria) Yulian Radionov
- (Bulgaria) Nikolay Varbanov
- (Bulgaria) Pavlin Ivanov
- (Croatia) Franko Kaštropil
- (Montenegro) Nemanja Milošević
- (Serbia) Ninoslav Tmušić
- (Serbia) Nenad Djorić
- (Serbia) Zoran Stevanovic
- (United States) John Ofoegbu
- (United States) Tony Gugino
- (Ukraine) Yaroslav Zubrytskiy
- (Ukraine) Volodymyr Ryzhov
- (Russia) Sergey Grishaev
- (Russia) Anatoliy Yasinskiy

== Head coaches ==
- (Bulgaria) Slavcho Slavov 1956-1959
- (Bulgaria) Dobri Rusev 1959-1960
- (Bulgaria) Ivan Stoyanov 1960-1964
- (Bulgaria) Blagoy Peev 1964-1965
- (Bulgaria) Ivan Stoyanov 1965-1969
- (Bulgaria) Velcho Petrov 1969-1972
- (Bulgaria) Valcho Yordanov 1972-1976
- (Bulgaria) Simeon Varchev 1976-1980
- (Bulgaria) Ivan Glavov 1980-1981
- (Bulgaria) Hristo Kostov 1981-1984
- (Bulgaria) Ivan Angelov 1984-1986
- (Bulgaria) Velcho Petrov 1986-1987
- (Bulgaria) Mityo Georgiev 1987-1989
- (Bulgaria) Ivan Cholakov 1989-2002^{1}
- (Serbia) Zoran Krečković 2002–2003
- (Bulgaria) Valeri Bachvarov 2003-2004
- (Bulgaria) Ivan Cholakov 2004-2013^{2}
- (Bulgaria) Yulian Radionov 2013–2015
- (Bulgaria) Petar Petrov 2015–2017^{3}
- (Bulgaria) Ivan Cholakov 2017–2020
- (Bulgaria) Toni Dechev 2020–2022
- (Bulgaria) Aleksander Aleksiev 2022–2023
- (Bulgaria) Toni Dechev 2023–2024
- (Bulgaria) Aleksander Aleksiev 2024–2025
- (Bulgaria) Stoyo Cholakov 2025–2026
- (Bulgaria) Todor Todorov 2026–Present

^{1}During the 2001–02 season, Vitaly Lebedintsev coached 6 regular season games. Lebedintsev was fired in November 2001, and Ivan Cholakov coached the remaining season games.
^{2}During the 2010–11 season, Ivailo Stoimenov coached 7 regular season games. Stoimenov resigned on November 29, 2010, and Ivan Cholakov coached the remaining season games.
^{3}During the 2015–16 season, Ninoslav Marjanovic coached 9 regular season games. Marjanovic resigned on December 5, 2015.
