= Mladen Vitković =

Serbian basketball player

BC Korac Zürich
- Position: Power forward

Personal information
- Born: 22 March 1990 (age 36) Niš, Serbia, Yugoslavia
- Listed height: 2.01 m (6 ft 7 in)

Career information
- NBA draft: 2012: undrafted
- Playing career: 2009–present

Career history
- 2009–2016: Konstantin
- 2016–2018: Tamiš
- 2018–2019: Academic Plovdiv
- 2019–2020: Apollo Amsterdam
- 2020–2021: Kolubara LA 2003
- 2021-2022: Mladost SP
- 2022–2024: BC Winterthur
- 2025–present: BC Korac Zürich

Mladen Vitković (born 22 March 1990) is a Serbian semi-professional basketball player for BC Korac Zürich of the Swiss Basket League. Standing at 201 cm (6 ft 7 in), he plays as power forward. He started his career in 2012 with OKK Konstantin.
