= Evan Ravenel =

American basketball player (born 1989)

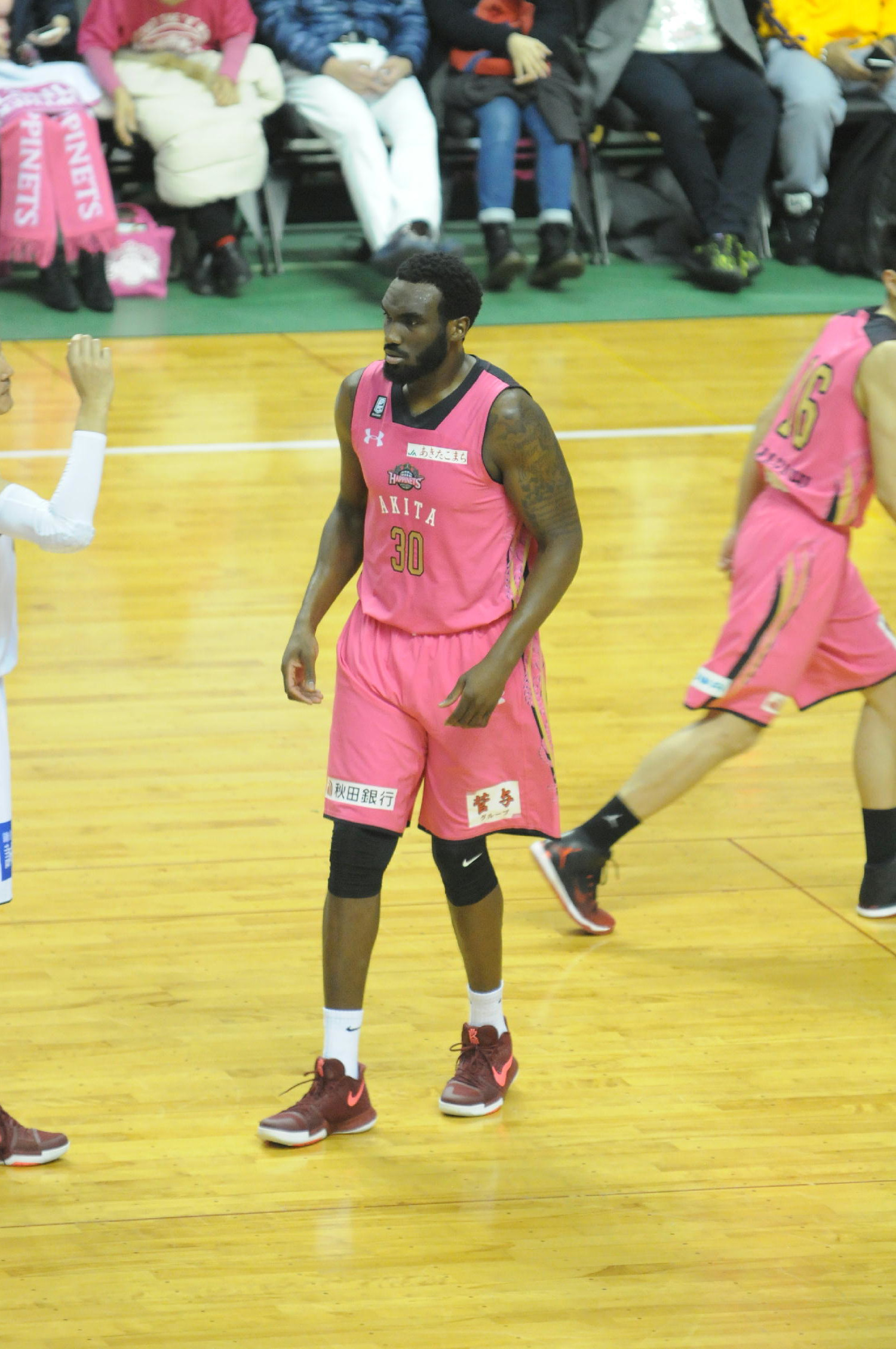

Free agent
- Position: Power forward

Personal information
- Born: November 24, 1989 (age 36) Tampa, Florida, U.S.
- Listed height: 6 ft 8 in (2.03 m)
- Listed weight: 250 lb (113 kg)

Career information
- High school: Brandon (Tampa, Florida)
- College: Boston College (2008–2010); Ohio State (2011–2013)
- NBA draft: 2013: undrafted
- Playing career: 2013–present

Career history
- 2013–2014: Rilski Sportist
- 2014–2015: Polpharma Starogard Gdanski
- 2015–2016: Ryukyu Golden Kings
- 2016: Liège
- 2017: Akita Northern Happinets
- 2017–2018: Rilski Sportist
- 2018–2019: Fukushima Firebonds
- 2019–2020: Quimsa
- 2020–2021: Kumamoto Volters
- 2021–2023: Altiri Chiba
- 2023–2024: Kagawa Five Arrows
- 2024–2025: Niigata Albirex BB

Career highlights
- bj league champion (2016); Bulgarian Basketball Cup champion (2018)

Evan Ravenel (born November 24, 1989), nicknamed E, is an American professional basketball player for Niigata Albirex BB of the B3 League.

== College career ==
He began his collegiate career at Boston College, and was transferred to the Ohio State Buckeyes. He helped the OSU advance to the NCAA Final Four as a college junior.

== Professional career ==
Ravenel played for the Ryukyu Golden Kings of Okinawa in 2015-16. The team won that season's bj league championship title and Ravenel was awarded playoff MVP.

On January 16, 2017, he signed with the Akita Northern Happinets of B.League. In 2017-18, he played for BC Rilski Sportist in Bulgaria and posted 11.4 points and 5.6 rebounds per game. Ravenel signed with the Fukushima Firebonds of the B.League on August 15, 2018.

In October, 2019, Ravenel joined to the Quimsa.

On July 3, 2020, Ravenel signed with the Kumamoto Volters of the B.League.

On July 3, 2024, Ravenel signed with the Niigata Albirex BB of the B.League.

== Personal ==
Evan and his younger sister Erin are the children of Pamela and Eugene Ravenel.

== College statistics ==
Year	Team	GP	GS	MPG	FG%	3P%	FT%	RPG	APG	SPG	BPG	PPG
2008-09	Boston College	14	0	10.3	32.1	-	58.8	1.36	0.36	0.21	0.57	2.00
2009-10	Boston College	25	0	10.5	49.2	-	71.4	2.44	0.40	0.08	0.36	3.28
2010-11	Ohio State											
2011-12	Ohio State	39	4	10.2	54.1	-	69.5	2.15	0.26	0.26	0.23	3.41
2012-13	Ohio State	37	12	16.8	51.4	0.00	64.9	4.16	0.32	0.35	0.73	4.89
Career		115	16	12.4	.500	.000	.671	2.77	0.32	0.24	0.46	3.69

== Career statistics ==
Legend
GP	Games played	GS	Games started	MPG	Minutes per game
FG%	Field goal percentage	3P%	3-point field goal percentage	FT%	Free throw percentage
RPG	Rebounds per game	APG	Assists per game	SPG	Steals per game
BPG	Blocks per game	PPG	Points per game	**Bold**	Career high

=== NBA Preseason Stats ===
Year	Team	GP	GS	MPG	FG%	3P%	FT%	RPG	APG	SPG	BPG	PPG
2016-17	Maccabi Haifa	1	0	16.2	.500	.500	.500	2.00	1.00	0.00	0.00	6.00

†	Denotes seasons in which Ravenel won an championship

=== Regular season ===
Year	Team	GP	GS	MPG	FG%	3P%	FT%	RPG	APG	SPG	BPG	PPG
2013-14	Rilski Sportist	32	31	26.3	50.5	28.6	71.3	7.06	1.62	0.88	0.78	13.12
2014-15	Polpharma Starogard Gdanski	12	12	30.3	50.7	26.9	82.7	9.33	0.92	1.00	0.25	18.50
2015-16†	Ryukyu	50	50	27.2	58.8	20.0	81.3	10.5	1.7	0.9	0.4	17.3
2016-17	Liège	4	3	21.8	41.0	20.0	80.0	3.75	0.75	0.50	0.00	11.25
2016-17	Akita	31	5	18.8	40.8	22.0	79.1	5.4	1.7	0.4	0.2	8.7
2017-18	Rilski Sportist	36	8	19.7	60.6	26.5	75.7	5.47	1.47	0.67	0.14	11.75
2018-19	Fukushima	55	55	28.14	53.8	33.5	80.3	9.0	2.9	0.98	0.38	21.9

=== Playoffs ===
Year	Team	GP	GS	MPG	FG%	3P%	FT%	RPG	APG	SPG	BPG	PPG
2013-14	Rilski	2		24.0	.524	.000	.667	3.5	1.0	0.5	0.0	14.0
2015-16	Ryukyu	6	6	25.67	.364	1.000	.769	10.67	1.33	0.83	0	14.17
2016-17	Akita	3	0	9.22	.538	.000	.500	2.3	0.3	0	0	5.3
2017-18	Rilski	8	0	20.3	.526	.100	.737	5.6	0.6	0.6	1.1	9.4

=== Early cup games ===
Year	Team	GP	GS	MPG	FG%	3P%	FT%	RPG	APG	SPG	BPG	PPG
2018	Fukushima	2	2	28.14	.536	.400	1.000	8.0	4.0	1.0	0.5	18.0
