= Tony Gugino =

American basketball player (born 1986)

Academic Plovdiv
- Position: Power forward
- League: National Basketball League

Personal information
- Born: May 7, 1986 (age 40) Holland, Michigan, U.S.
- Listed height: 6 ft 10 in (2.08 m)
- Listed weight: 188 lb (85 kg)

Career information
- High school: Holland Christian (Holland, Michigan)
- College: Hillsdale (2005–2009)
- NBA draft: 2009: undrafted
- Playing career: 2009–present

Career history
- 2009–2011: Boncourt
- 2011–2012: SAM Massagno
- 2012: Yambol
- 2012–2013: Rilski Sportist
- 2013–2014: BBC Monthey
- 2014–2016: Rilski Sportist
- 2016: Liège
- 2016–2018: Phoenix Galați
- 2018–2019: Rilski Sportist
- 2019–2020: CS Dinamo București
- 2020–present: Academic Plovdiv

Career highlights
- Bulgarian Cup winner (2016); Bulgarian Cup MVP (2016); First-team All-GLIAC (2009)

Tony Gugino (born May 7, 1986) is an American professional basketball player for Academic Plovdiv in the Bulgarian National Basketball League. He played college basketball for Hillsdale College.

== Professional career ==
During his career, Gugino played for Basket-club Boncourt, SAM Basket Massagno, BC Yambol, BC Rilski Sportist and BBC Monthey.

In July 2014, Gugino signed with BC Rilski Sportist. After spending two seasons in Romania with Phoenix Galați, he signed with Rilski Sportist on August 30, 2018.

Gugino played for CS Dinamo București of the Liga Națională in the 2019–20 season, averaging 6.5 points and 3.4 rebounds per game. On July 21, 2020, he signed with Academic Plovdiv in Bulgaria.
