= Hristo Zahariev =

Bulgarian basketball player

Balkan
- Position: Shooting guard
- League: Bulgarian League

Personal information
- Born: October 27, 1990 (age 36) Sofia, Bulgaria
- Listed height: 6 ft 6 in (1.98 m)
- Listed weight: 200 lb (91 kg)

Career information
- Playing career: 2004–present

Career history
- 2006–2008: Lukoil Academic
- 2007–2007: → Spartak Sofia
- 2008–2009: Fortitudo Bologna
- 2009–2010: Varese
- 2010–2011: BC Chernomorets
- 2011–2013: Rilski Sportist
- 2013–2014: Levski Sofia
- 2014–2015: Lukoil Academic
- 2015–2016: Pallacanestro Trieste 2004
- 2016–2017: Lukoil Academic
- 2017–2018: Balkan
- 2018–2022: Levski Lukoil
- 2022–?: Balkan
- ?–2024: Livorno
- 2025-present: Spartak Pleven

Career highlights
- BIBL champion (2014); 2× NBL champion (2014, 2021); 2× Bulgarian Cup champion (2014, 2020); Bulgarian Cup MVP (2020)

Hristo Zahariev (Bulgarian: Христо Захариев) is a Bulgarian professional basketball player who plays for Spartak Pleven.

== Honours ==
=== Levski Sofia ===
- Balkan League (1): 2013–14
- Bulgarian League (1): 2013–14
- Bulgarian Cup (1): 2013–14
