= Stanislav Govedarov =

Bulgarian basketball player

No. 11 – BC Yambol
- Position: Shooting guard / point guard
- League: NBL

Personal information
- Born: 13 November 1980 (age 46) Plovdiv, Bulgaria
- Listed height: 6 ft 2 in (1.88 m)
- Listed weight: 168 lb (76 kg)

Career information
- Playing career: 1999–2019

Career history
- 1999–2003: Academic Plovdiv
- 2003–2019: Yambol

Stanislav Govedarov (Bulgarian: Станислав Говедаров) (born 13 November 1980) is a former Bulgarian professional basketball player, who last played for BC Yambol in the Bulgarian League, as a shooting guard or point guard. He is well known as 'Mainata' among his teammates. Govedarov is born in Plovdiv and began his career in the local team - Academic Plovdiv. He was named the chairman of the board of BC Yambol in August 2021
