= Asen Velikov =

Bulgarian basketball player

Personal information
- Born: January 11, 1986 (age 40) Pleven, Bulgaria
- Listed height: 6 ft 2 in (1.88 m)
- Listed weight: 176 lb (80 kg)

Career information
- Playing career: 2006–present
- Position: Point guard

Career history
- 2006–2007: Lukoil Academic
- 2007–2011: Levski Sofia
- 2011–2012: Rilski Sportist
- 2012–2015: Cherno More
- 2015-2018: Lukoil Academic
- 2018–2025: Levski Sofia
- 2025–2026: Academic Plovdiv

Career highlights
- 2× Bulgarian League champion (2018, 2021)

Asen Velikov (Bulgarian: Асен Великов) (born January 11, 1986) is a Bulgarian professional basketball player, who is currently playing for Levski Sofia in the Bulgarian League, as a point guard. Velikov was born in Pleven.
