= Dragan Tubak =

Serbian-Bosnian basketball player

Free agent
- Position: Center

Personal information
- Born: April 10, 1987 (age 39) Banja Luka, SR Bosnia and Herzegovina, SFR Yugoslavia
- Listed height: 7 ft 1 in (2.16 m)
- Listed weight: 276 lb (125 kg)

Career information
- NBA draft: 2009: undrafted
- Playing career: 2006–present

Career history
- 2006–2010: FMP II
- 2007–2009: →Borac Čačak
- 2010–2012: Radnički Basket
- 2012–2013: VOO Wolves Verviers-Pepinster
- 2013: Leuven Bears
- 2013–2014: Maghreb de Fes
- 2014–2015: MCO Mouloudia Oujda
- 2015–2016: Feni Industries
- 2016–2017: Kutaisi 2010
- 2017–2018: Cherno More
- 2018–2019: Borac Banja Luka
- 2021: SOA

Dragan Tubak (Serbian Cyrillic: Драган Тубак; born April 10, 1987) is a Serbian-Bosnian professional basketball player.

In December 2021, Tubak was on the roster of Ivorian club SOA to play in the 2022 BAL qualification.
