= Bozhidar Avramov =

Bulgarian professional basketball player

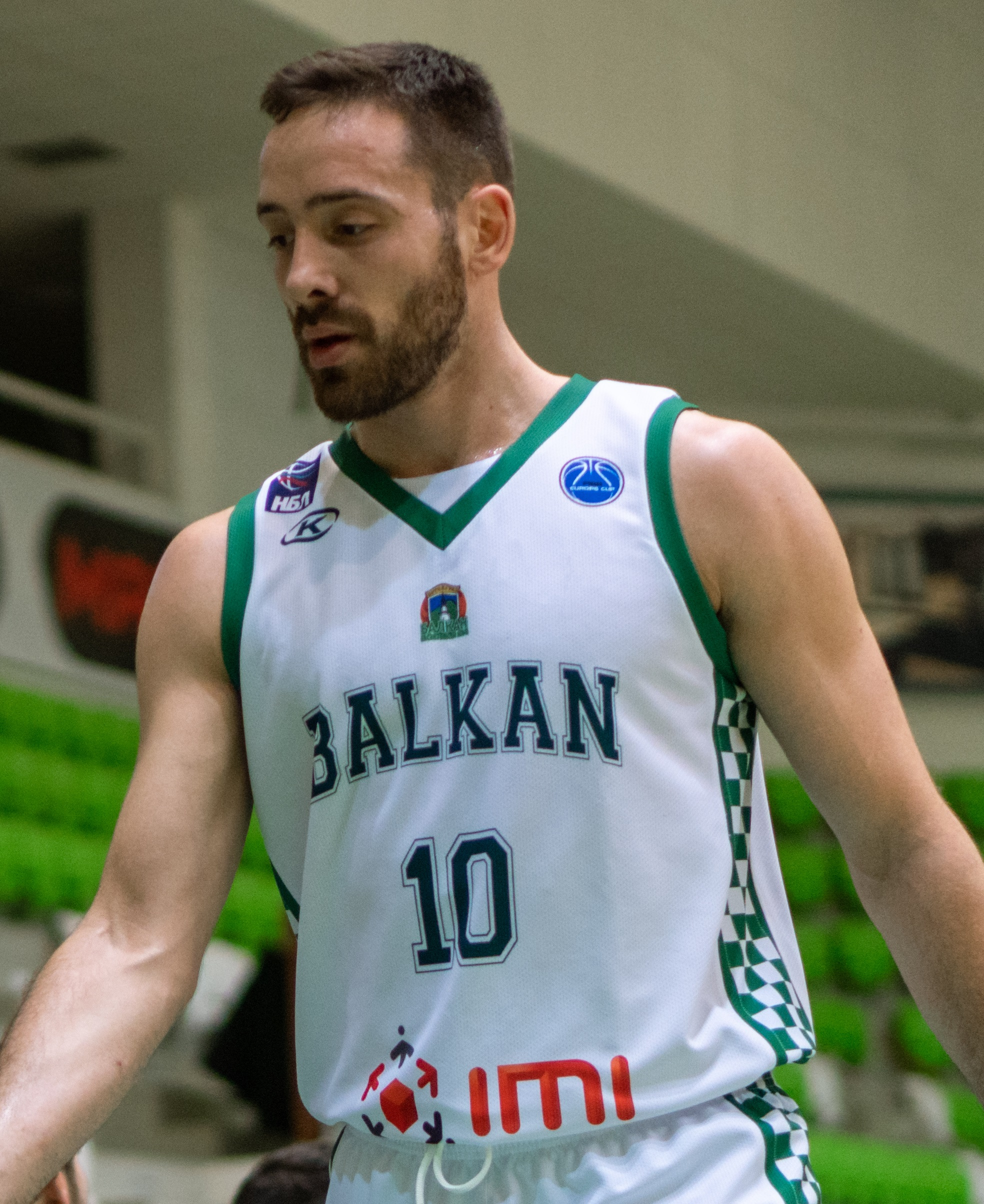

No. 17 – BC Lokomotiv Plovdiv
- Position: Point guard / shooting guard
- League: BBL

Personal information
- Born: 8 March 1990 (age 36) Varna, Bulgaria
- Listed height: 1.96 m (6 ft 5 in)
- Listed weight: 98 kg (216 lb)

Career information
- Playing career: 2006–present

Career history
- 2006–2007: Cherno More Varna
- 2007–2010: Valencia
- 2008: → Gandía BA
- 2010: Olympia Larissa
- 2010–2014: Lukoil Academic
- 2014: Cherno More Varna
- 2014–2015: Juvecaserta Basket
- 2015: Asesoft Ploiești
- 2015–2018: Lukoil Academic
- 2018–2019: Levski Lukoil
- 2019: Pitești
- 2020: Cherno More Ticha
- 2020–2021: Balkan
- 2021–2023: Spartak
- 2023–2024: CSKA Sofia
- 2024: Supernova Fiumicino
- 2024-2025: Lokomotiv Plovdiv

Career highlights
- Bulgarian League Finals MVP (2018); Bulgarian League champion (2018)

Bozhidar Avramov (Bulgarian: Божидар Аврамов) (born 8 March 1990) is a Bulgarian professional basketball player. He currently plays for the BC Lokomotiv Plovdiv. He was recently also a member of the Bulgarian national team.
