= Konstantin Papazov =

Bulgarian basketball player and coach

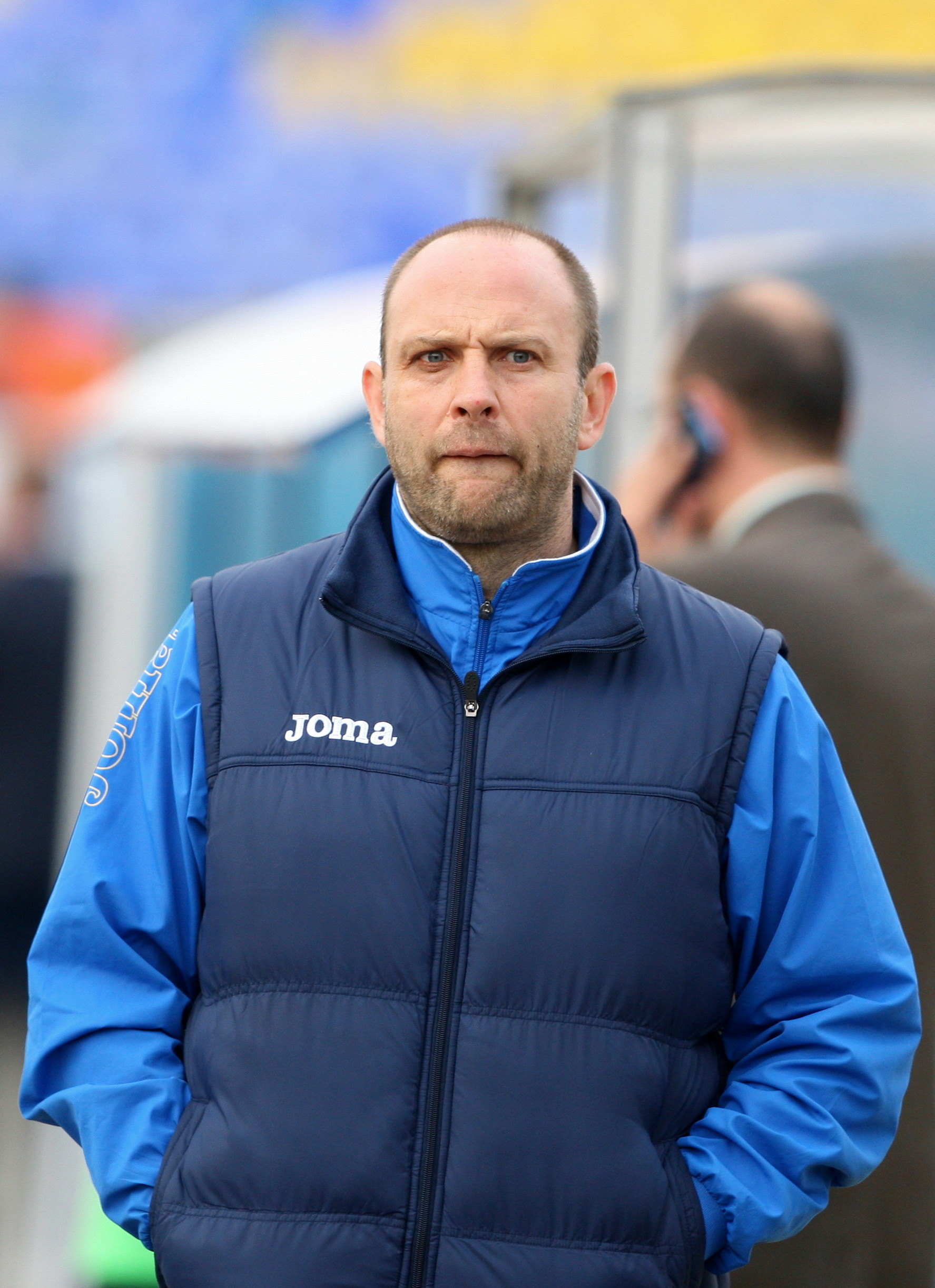
- Papazov in 2014.

Levski Sofia
- Position: Head coach

Personal information
- Born: July 17, 1967 (age 59) Sofia, Bulgaria

Career information
- Playing career: 1986–1991

Career history

Playing
- Levski Sofia
- BC Slavia
- BC Svoge

Coaching
- Levski Sofia
- BC Academic Sofia

Konstantin Papazov (better known as Titi Papazov) (Bulgarian: Константин Папазов - Тити) is a Bulgarian basketball player and current basketball coach. Titi Papazov was named "Coach of the Year of Bulgaria" in 2009.

He was born on July 17, 1967, in Sofia. He played professionally for the senior teams of Levski, Slavia and Svoge between 1986 and 1991. In 1994, Papazov was elected as president of the Slavia basketball club. The team won the Bulgarian Championship and the Bulgarian Cup in 1997. He has been the coach of the men's team "Levski" and "Academic" and the male and female national teams of Bulgaria. Papazov is married and has two sons.

== Honours ==
As a coach Levski Sofia

- Bulgarian champion – 2000, 2001, 2014, 2018, 2021
- Bulgarian Cup – 2001, 2009, 2010, 2014, 2019, 2020
- Bulgarian Supercup – 2018, 2019
- Balkan League – 2010, 2014, 2018
- Coach of the Year in Bulgaria – 2009
