= Sports Hall Diana =

Multifunctional indoor arena in Yambol, Bulgaria

Coordinates: 42.4869°N 26.4994°E

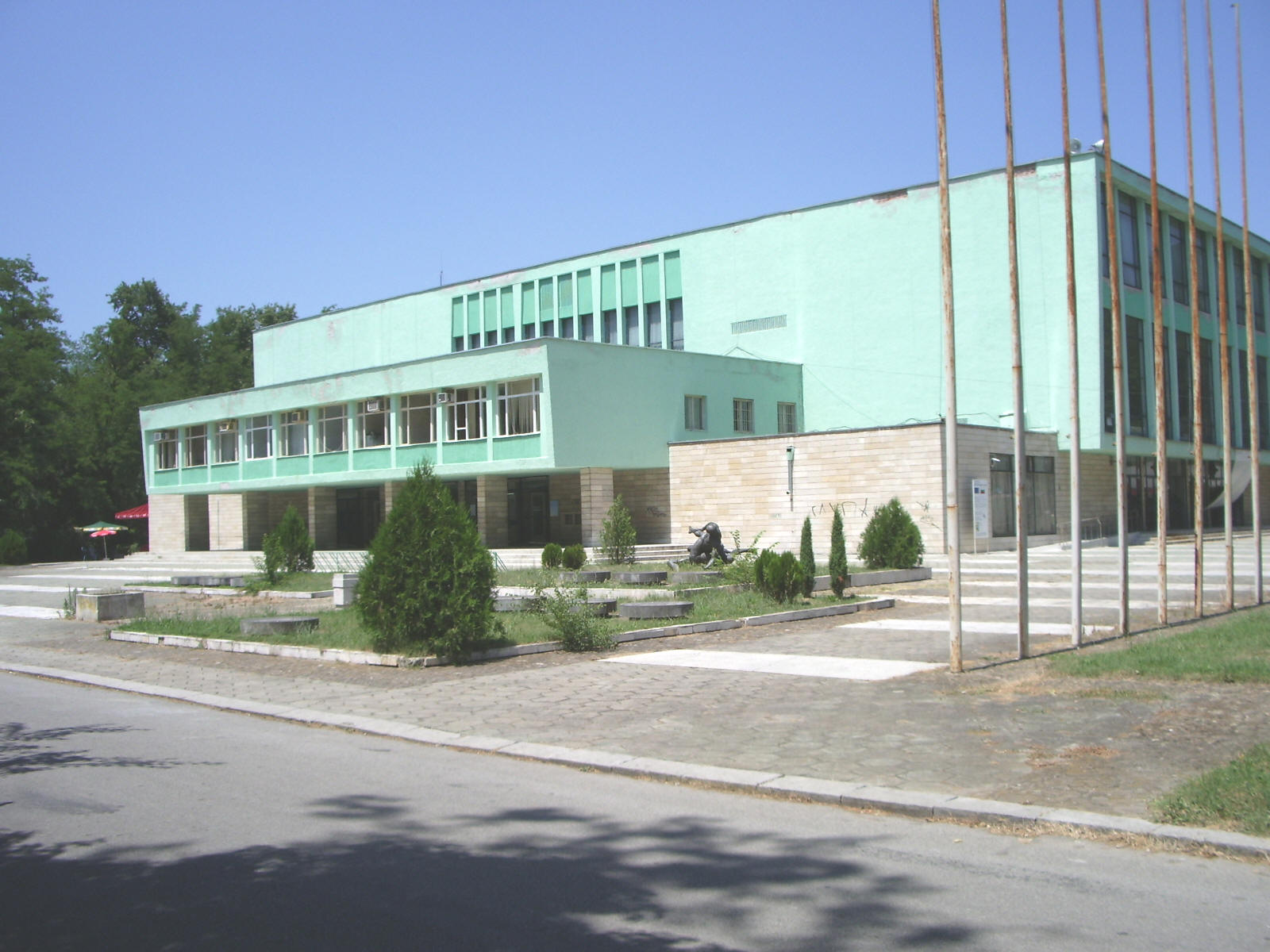
- Interactive map of Sports Hall Diana
- Location: Yambol, Bulgaria
- Owner: Yambol Municipality
- Capacity: 1,800

Construction
- Opened: 1964

Tenant
- BC Yambol

Diana Hall (Bulgarian: Зала "Диана") is a multifunctional Indoor arena in Yambol, Bulgaria. The arena was opened in 1964 and has a seating capacity for 1,800 people. It is the home of BC Yambol. Besides basketball, local teams use the arena for practicing trampolining, boxing, wrestling, and range shooting . The arena has hosted many national and European tournaments, including the 2010 Bulgarian Basketball Cup, NBL all-star game 2015, the Strandzha Cup, and the international wrestling tournament Dan Kolov.

In 2026, the hall was renovated, after it was closed in 2024. The reconstruction cost around 4 millions euro. The seating capacity was reduced from 3,000 to 1,800, but the court size was expanded into FIBA standards.

== See also ==
- List of indoor arenas in Bulgaria
