= Universiada Hall =

Multifunctional hall in Sofia, Bulgaria

- Зала "Универсиада
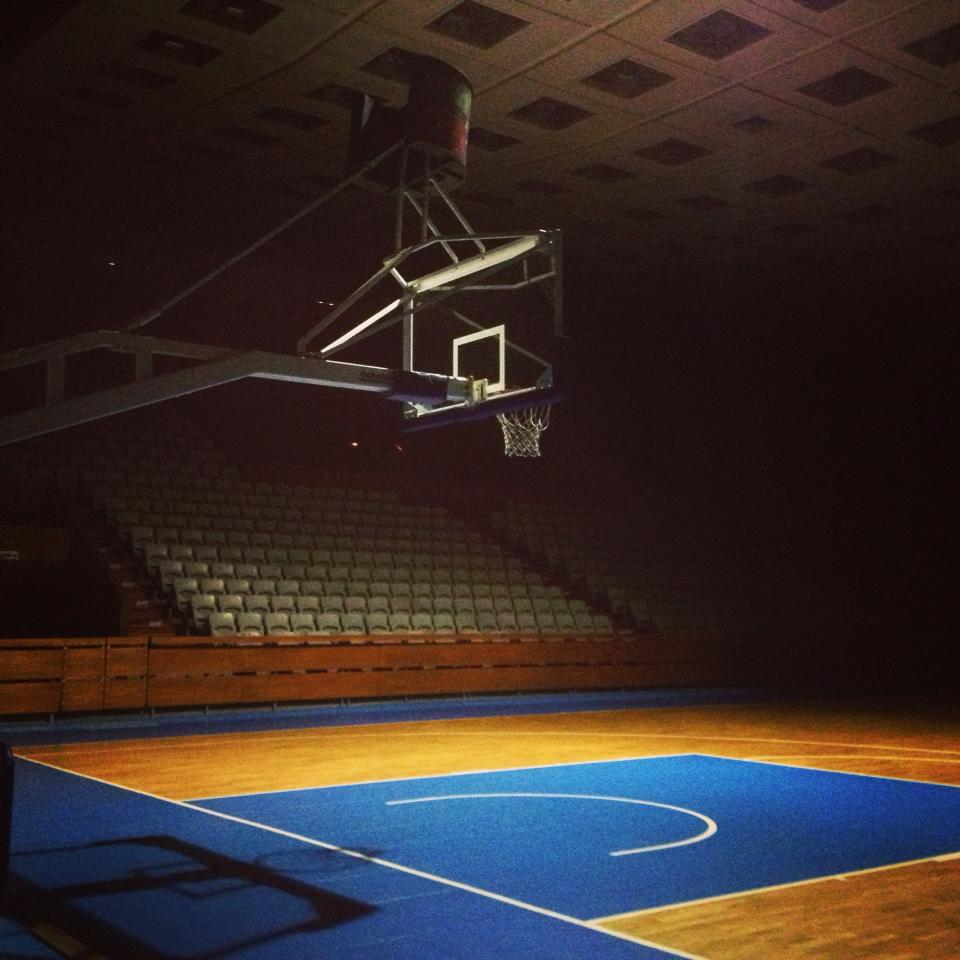
- Interactive map of Universiada Hall
- Location: Sofia, Bulgaria
- Coordinates: 42°40′52″N 23°21′20″E
- Capacity: 4,000

Construction
- Opened: 1961

Website
- universiada-bg.com

Universiada Hall (Bulgarian: Зала "Универсиада") is an Indoor arena in Sofia, Bulgaria. Opened in 1961 for the II Summer Universiade, the arena has a seating capacity for 4,000 people and is the regular home venue of the Levski Sofia basketball team.
