= BC Levski Sofia =

Levski
- Nickname: Сините (The Blues)
- Leagues: NBL; Balkan League
- Founded: 1923; 103 years ago
- Arena: Universiada Hall
- Capacity: 4,000
- Location: Sofia, Bulgaria
- Team colors: Blue, White, Gold
- President: Konstantin Papazov
- Head coach: Dimitar Angelov
- Team captain: Asen Velikov
- Championships: Men: 16 Bulgarian Championships; 16 Bulgarian Cups; 3 Bulgarian Super Cups; 3 Balkan Leagues; Women: 8 Bulgarian Championships; 13 Bulgarian Cups; 1 EuroLeague; 2 EuroCups
- Website: www.levskibasket.com
Home	Away

Basketball Club Levski Sofia (Bulgarian: Баскетболен клуб Левски София), simply known as Levski (Bulgarian: Левски), is a Bulgarian professional basketball club based in the capital Sofia. It is the basketball section of Levski Sofia sports club.

== History ==
Founded in 1923, Levski has won a record 62 honours: 16 NBL titles, 16 Bulgarian Cups and 3 Bulgarian Supercups/Men/ & 8 Bulgarian championships and 13 Bulgarian Cups/Women/. International titles won by the club are: 1 EuroLeague in 1984, 2 EuroCups in 1978 & 1979 and 3 Balkan Leagues (regional European title) in 2010, 2014 & 2018. They play their home matches at the Universiade Hall in Sofia.

In 2018, Lukoil announced its sponsorship deal with Levski. Consequently, the new club name would be Levski Lukoil.

== Honours ==
=== Men ===
- National Basketball League
  - Winners (16): 1942, 1945, 1946, 1947, 1978, 1979, 1981, 1982, 1986, 1993, 1994, 2000, 2001, 2014, 2018, 2021
- Bulgarian Cup
  - Winners: (16) 1969, 1971, 1972, 1976, 1979, 1980, 1982, 1983, 1993, 2001, 2009, 2010, 2014, 2019, 2020, 2023
- Bulgarian Basketball Super Cup
  - Winners: (3) 2018, 2019, 2023
- Balkan League
  - Winners (3): 2010, 2014, 2018
    - Runners-up (2): 2012, 2013
- Zivanario International Basketball Tournament
  - Winners: (1) 2006

=== Women ===
- Bulgarian Women's Basketball Championship
  - Winners (8): 1980, 1983, 1984, 1985, 1986, 1987, 1988, 1994
- Bulgarian Women's Basketball Cup
  - Winners (13): 1969, 1972, 1974, 1976, 1977, 1980, 1982, 1983, 1985, 1986, 1987, 1989, 1991
- EuroLeague
  - Winners (1): 1984
- Ronchetti Cup / EuroCup
  - Winners (2): 1978, 1979
    - Runners-up (1): 1975

== Players ==
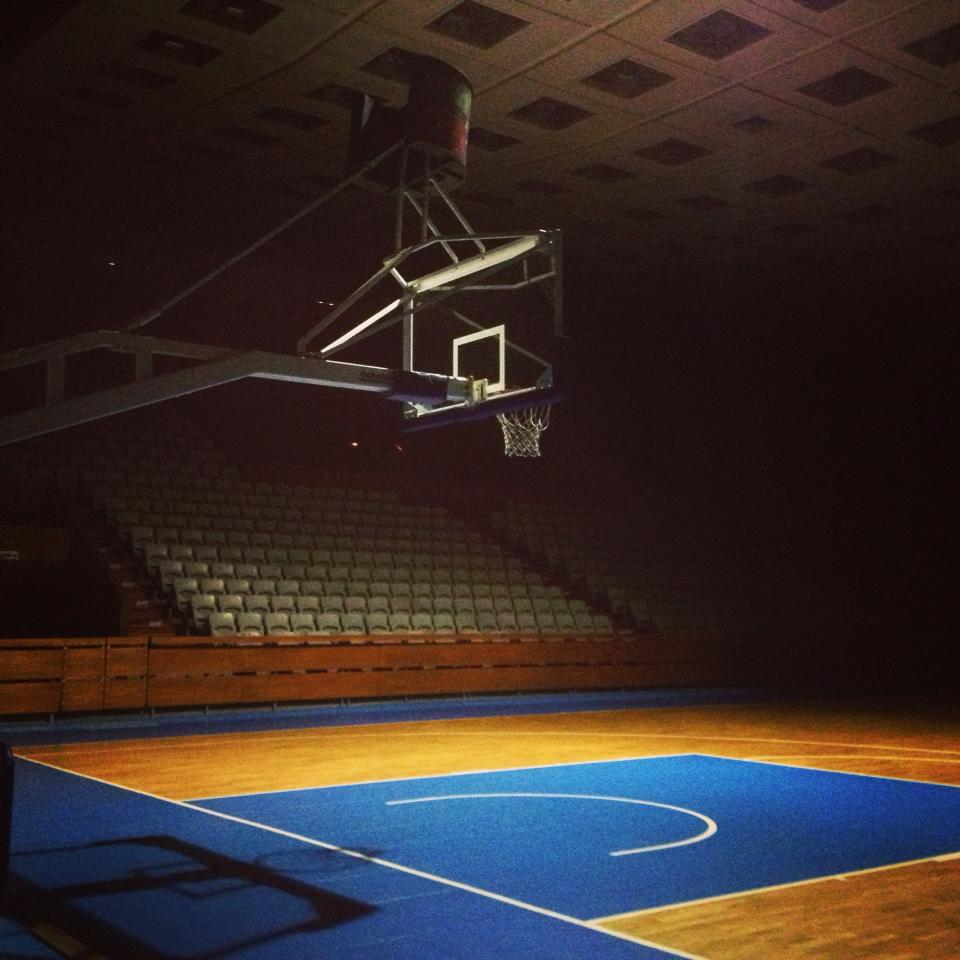
Universiada Hall, Home of Levski

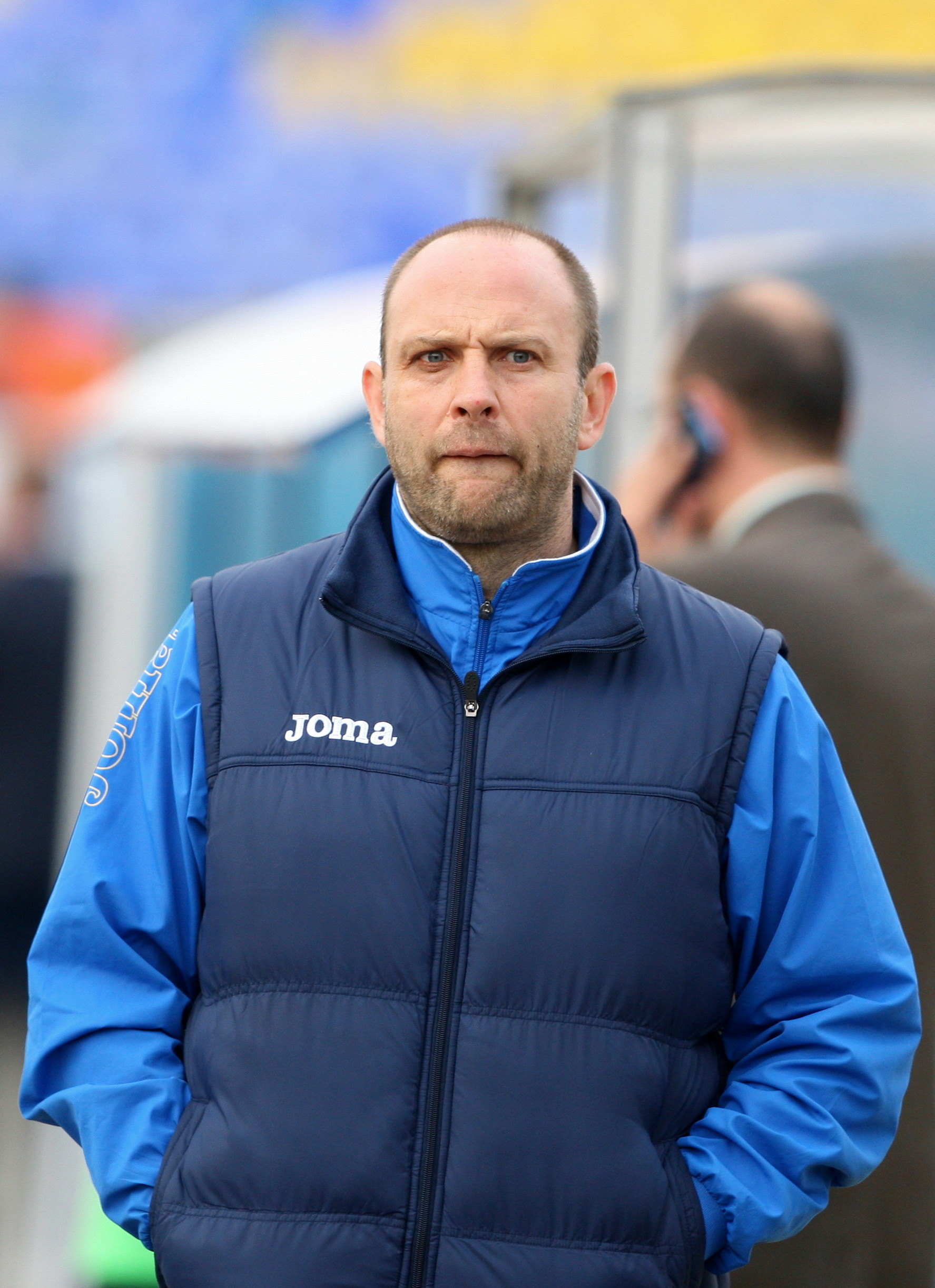
Konstantin Titi Papazov

=== Current roster ===
Note: Flags indicate national team eligibility at FIBA-sanctioned events. Players may hold other non-FIBA nationalities not displayed.

Levski Sofia roster
Players
Coaches

Pos.	No.	Nat.	Name	Ht.	Wt.	Age
SG	0	(United States)	Arnett, Alan	1.96 m (6 ft 5 in)	86 kg (190 lb)	34 – 1 March 1991
PF	1	(Bulgaria)	Mirchev, Mario	2.04 m (6 ft 8 in)	94 kg (207 lb)	26 – 18 March 1999
PG	2	(Bulgaria)	Kadiev, Momchil	1.83 m (6 ft 0 in)	73 kg (161 lb)	20 – 28 August 2005
PG	6	(Bulgaria)	Dimitrov, Lachezar	1.87 m (6 ft 2 in)	82 kg (181 lb)	26 – 17 August 1999
G	7	(Bulgaria)	Petrov, Krasimir	1.89 m (6 ft 2 in)	79 kg (174 lb)	21 – 7 September 2004
PG	13	(Bulgaria)	Velikov, Asen (C)	1.88 m (6 ft 2 in)	88 kg (194 lb)	40 – 11 January 1986
F	15	(Bulgaria)	Bochev, Maksim	1.92 m (6 ft 4 in)	85 kg (187 lb)	20 – 7 September 2005
SF	23	(Bulgaria)	Boyanov, Mario	1.90 m (6 ft 3 in)	83 kg (183 lb)	21 – 24 September 2004
PF	24	(Bulgaria)	Nikolov, Damyan	2.00 m (6 ft 7 in)	85 kg (187 lb)	19 – 30 June 2006
SG	30	(Bulgaria)	Papazov, Aleksandar	1.86 m (6 ft 1 in)	69 kg (152 lb)	22 – 30 January 2003
C	32	(United States)	Florveus, John	2.11 m (6 ft 11 in)	109 kg (240 lb)	35 – 10 October 1990
F/C	33	(Bulgaria)	Marincheshki, Dimitar	2.00 m (6 ft 7 in)	105 kg (231 lb)	35 – 8 September 1990
F	42	(Bulgaria)	Georgiev, Zlatin	1.98 m (6 ft 6 in)	101 kg (223 lb)	40 – 22 May 1985

Head coach

- (Bulgaria) Dimitar Angelov

Assistant coach(es)

- (Bulgaria) Bozhidar Gyorev

Strength & conditioning coach(es)

- (Bulgaria) Svetoslav Andonov

Physiotherapist(s)

- (Bulgaria) Yavor Kasabov

Legend

- (C) Team captain
- Injured

- Roster
Updated: 23 October 2023

=== Notable players ===
Note: Flags indicate national team eligibility at FIBA-sanctioned events. Players may hold other non-FIBA nationalities not displayed.

Criteria

To appear in this section a player must have either:

- Set a club record or won an individual award while at the club
- Played at least one official international match for their national team at any time
- Played at least one official NBA match at any time.

- (Bulgaria) Iliya Mirchev
- (Bulgaria) Mincho Dimov
- (Bulgaria) Atanas Golomeev
- (Bulgaria) Georgi Mladenov
- (Bulgaria) Yordan Minchev
- (Bulgaria) Vassil Evtimov
- (Bulgaria) Ilian Evtimov
- (Bulgaria) Kaloyan Ivanov
- (Bulgaria) Deyan Ivanov
- (Bulgaria) Asen Velikov
- (Bulgaria) Dimitar Angelov
- (Greece) (Canada) Elijah Mitrou-Long
- (North Macedonia) Gjorgji Čekovski
- (North Macedonia) Stojan Gjuroski
- (Serbia) Srđan Dabić
- (United States) Marcus Hall
- (United States) Charles Jones
- (United States) Dwayne Morton
- (United States) Aaron Harper
- (United States) Brandon Heath
- (South Africa) Fusi Mazibuko
- (Bulgaria) Krasimira Bogdanova
- (Bulgaria) Nadka Golcheva
- (Bulgaria) Petkana Makaveeva
- (Bulgaria) Silviya Germanova
- (Bulgaria) Kostadinka Radkova
- (Bulgaria) Madlena Staneva
- (Bulgaria) Nina Khadzhiyankova
- (Bulgaria) Krasimira Banova
