= Maksim Chokov =

Bulgarian basketball player (born 2007)

No. 8 – Academic Bultex 99
- Position: Shooting Guard
- League: NBL

Personal information
- Born: 21 March 2007 (age 19) Burgas, Bulgaria
- Listed height: 187 cm (6 ft 2 in)
- Listed weight: 70 kg (154 lb)

Career information
- Playing career: 2021–present

Career history
- 2021–2024: Chernomorets Burgas
- 2024–2025: Shumen
- 2025: Cherno More Ticha
- 2025–present: Academic Bultex 99

Career highlights
- 2x NBL second place (2023, 2025); NBL third place (2024); 2x Bulgarian Cup (2024, 2025)

Maksim Chokov (Bulgarian: Максикм Чоков; born 21 March 2007) is a Bulgarian professional basketball player for Academic Bultex 99 in the National Basketball League.

== Club career ==
=== Chernomorets Burgas ===
In 2021, Chokov started his professional career playing for local Bulgarian club Chernomorets Burgas. On 16 October 2021, Chokov made his debut in a 114–63 win against Shumen at the age of only 14. In the 2021–22 and 2022–23 seasons Chokov was primarily used asm a rotational player. In the 2022–23 season Chokov was a part of Chernomerets's second-place finish in the NBL. In the 2023–24 season Chokov started playing more for Chernomorets Burgas. In the 2023–24 season Chokov won the Bulagrian Cup and their third-place finish in the NBL. On 27 August 2024 Chokov renewed his contract with 'the sharks' for one more year. In 2024 Chokov left Chernomorets because of their bankrupt.

=== Shumen ===
On 4 October 2024, Chokov joined Shumen. On 12 October 2024, Chokov made his debut in a 96–91 loss against Levski Sofia. Chokov started to have more game time but after that he became a rotational player. After that he started to play for their youth team playing in the Bulgarian Youth League. Chokov only played 10 times for Shumen averaging 9.2 minutes, 1.8 points, 0.5 rebounds and 0.4 assists.

=== Chernoand More Ticha ===
On 5 February 2025, Chokov joined Cherno More Ticha. On 1 March 2025, Chokov was officially registered to play for Cherno More. On 9 March 2025, Chokov made his debut in a 90–74 win against Academic Plovdiv. Chokov missed playing in the Bulgarian Cup because of an illness. Despite Chokov missing the Bulgarian Cup Cherno More Ticha won the tournament. Chokov also got a silver medal with Cherno More despite him not playing in the final. Chokov played 5 times for 'the saliors' averaging 2.8 minutes, 2 points and 0.2 rebounds.

=== Academic Plovdiv ===
On 6 August 2025, Chokov signed for Academic Bultex 99. On 5 October 2025, Chokov made his debut in a 87–66 loss against Balkan Botevgrad. Currently, Chokov is getting more game time than the last season.
