= 2021 Bulgarian Basketball Cup =

Basketball tournament

Bulgarian Basketball Cup
- Duration: 11 March 2021 – 15 March 2021
- Games played: 7
- Teams: 8
- TV partner(s): Max Sport

Regular season
- Season MVP: Carvacho

Finals
- Champions: Rilski Sportist
- Runners-up: Levski
- Semifinalists: Balkan Botevgrad, Yambol

Statistical leaders
- Points: Lewis 22.0
- Rebounds: Carvacho 16.3
- Assists: Baldwin 12.0

Records
- Highest scoring: Beroe 88–98 Yambol (12 March 2021)

The 2021 Bulgarian Basketball Cup was the 67th edition of the annual cup tournament in Bulgaria. It is managed by the Bulgarian Basketball Federation and was held in Panagyurishte, Arena Asarel. The competition started at 11th of March 2021, with the quarterfinals and ended with the Final on March 15, 2021. Rilski Sportist won their third cup. Nico Carvacho was named MVP.

== Qualified teams ==
The first eight teams qualified after the first stage of the 2020-21 NBL regular season.

Pos	Team	Pld	W	L	Seed
1	Rilski Sportist	16	14	2	Seeded teams
2	Levski Lukoil	16	13	3	Seeded teams
3	Balkan Botevgrad	16	11	5	Seeded teams
4	Beroe	16	8	8	Seeded teams
5	Chernomorets	16	8	8	Non-seeded Teams
6	Academic Bultex 99	16	7	9	Non-seeded Teams
7	Yambol	16	6	10	Non-seeded Teams
8	Spartak Pleven	16	3	13	Non-seeded Teams
9	Cherno More Ticha	16	2	14	Did not qualify

== Draw ==
The 2021 Bulgarian Basketball Cup was drawn on 22 February 2021 at approximately 12:00. The seeded teams were paired in the quarterfinals with the non-seeded teams. There were not any restrictions for the draw of the semifinals.

== Bracket ==
Quarterfinals
Rilski Sportist	87
Bultex 99	78
Balkan Botevgrad	84
Chernomorets	71
Levski Lukoil	101
Spartak Pleven	62
Beroe	88
Yambol	98

Semifinals
Rilski Sportist	90
Balkan Botevgrad	48
Levski	100
Yambol	84

Final
Rilski Sportist	87
Levski	69

== Quarterfinals ==
11 March	Rilski Sportist	87–78	Academic Plovdiv
17:00(UTC+02)	Scoring by quarter: 19-15, 25-13, 25-21, 18-29
Max Sport 2	Pts: Brown 19; Rebs: Carvacho 11; Asts: Ivanov, Brown 5 PIR: Brown 26	Boxscore	Pts: Tomic 20; Rebs: Gugino, Tomic 7 Asts: Carson 7 PIR: Tomic 23

11 March	Balkan Botevgrad	84–71	Chernomorets
20:00(UTC+02)	Scoring by quarter: 24-11, 15-23, 28-13, 17-24
Max Sport 2	Pts: Minkov 20; Rebs: Balaban 9 Asts: Dimitrov, Chambers 6 PIR: Minkov 24	Boxscore	Pts: Lewis 22; Rebs: Lewis 8 Asts: Baldwin 12; PIR: Baldwin 27

12 March	Levski	101–62	Spartak Pleven
17:00(UTC+02)	Scoring by quarter: 28-16, 29-13, 15-13, 29-20
Max Sport 2	Pts: Benson 20; Rebs: Benson 10; Asts: Zahariev 5 PIR: Benson 34	Boxscore	Pts: Paskov 10; Rebs: Marincheshki 7 Asts: Hristov 4 PIR: Ostojic, Marincheshki 8

12 March	Beroe	88–98	Yambol
20:00(UTC+02)	Scoring by quarter: 20-18, 22-23, 24-33, 22-24
Max Sport 2	Pts: Fagin 22; Rebs: Marinov 8 Asts: Gavin, Marinov 5 PIR: Fagin 22	Boxscore	Pts: Lilov 22; Rebs: Lilov 6 Asts: McGill 7 PIR: McGill 26

== Semifinals ==
13 March	Rilski Sportist	90–48	Balkan Botevgrad
17:00(UTC+02)	Scoring by quarter: 22-14, 25-16, 22-8, 21-10
Max Sport 2	Pts: Brown 15; Rebs: Carvacho 15; Asts: Brown 7 PIR: Carvacho 34	Boxscore	Pts: Dimitrov, Agee 14; Rebs: Dimitrov 8 Asts: Chambers, Avramov 3 PIR: Agee 17

13 March	Levski	100–84	Yambol
20:00(UTC+02)	Scoring by quarter: 24-26, 29-16, 28-21, 19-21
Max Sport 2	Pts: Benson 26; Rebs: Benson 12; Asts: Zahariev 7 PIR: Benson 38	Boxscore	Pts: McGill 15; Rebs: Ivanon, Krastanov 7 Asts: Ivanon, McGill 4 PIR: McGill 26

== Finals ==
15 March	Rilski Sportist	87–69	Levski
19:00	Scoring by quarter: 22-10, 21-21, 27-17, 17-21
Max Sport 2	Pts: Carvacho 21; Rebs: Carvacho 23; Asts: Brown 7 PIR: Carvacho 41	Boxscore	Pts: Tasic 17; Rebs: Benson 8 Asts: Zahariev 6 PIR: Tasic 22
