= 2023–24 National Basketball League (Bulgaria) season =

NBL
- Duration: 7 October 2023 – June 2024
- Games played: 192 (Regular season)
- Teams: 12
- TV partner(s): Max Sport

Regular season
- Top seed: Chernomorets
- Season MVP: (United States) Darrell Davis (Beroe)

Finals
- Champions: Rilski Sportist
- Runners-up: Balkan
- Third place: Chernomorets
- Fourth place: Spartak Pleven

The 2023–24 National Basketball League (Bulgaria) season is the 83rd season of the Bulgarian NBL.

== Teams ==
2023–24 Bulgarian National Basketball League club locations.

Club	Last season	Arena	Location	Capacity
Academic Plovdiv	8th	Kolodruma	Plovdiv	6,100
Balkan Botevgrad	1st	Arena Botevgrad	Botevgrad	4,500
Beroe	7th	Municipal Hall	Stara Zagora	1,000
Cherno More Ticha	11th	Hristo Borisov	Varna	1,000
Chernomorets	2nd	Boycho Branzov	Burgas	1,000
CSKA Sofia	3rd	CSKA	Sofia	450
Minyor 2015	1st (second division)	Boris Gyuderov Hall	Pernik	1,700
Levski	6th	Universiada Hall	Sofia	4,000
Rilski Sportist	4th	Arena Samokov	Samokov	2,500
Shumen	10th	Arena Shumen	Shumen	1,500
Spartak Pleven	5th	Balkanstroy	Pleven	1,200
Yambol	9th	Diana	Yambol	3,000

== Regular season ==
The twelve teams played two times against each one of the other teams for a total of 22 games. The league splits into two groups (one with the top 6 teams and the other with the bottom 6 teams) and each team played two games against each one of the teams from the same group (for a total of 10 games). The six teams from the first group and the best two teams from the second group joined the playoffs.

=== League table ===
Pos	Team	Pld	W	L	PF	PA	PD	Pts	Qualification (Note: Teams played each other twice (22 matches), before the league was split into two groups (the top six and the bottom six).)
1	Chernomorets	32	25	7	2731	2427	+304	57	Advance to playoffs
2	Rilski Sportist	32	24	8	2723	2418	+305	56	Advance to playoffs
3	Spartak Pleven	32	23	9	2787	2529	+258	55	Advance to playoffs
4	Balkan Botevgrad	32	21	11	2617	2508	+109	53	Advance to playoffs
5	CSKA Sofia	32	15	17	2683	2653	+30	47	Advance to playoffs
6	Cherno More	32	11	21	2601	2851	−250	43	Advance to playoffs
7	Shumen	32	15	17	2746	2634	+112	47	Advance to playoffs
8	Levski	32	14	18	2437	2478	−41	46	Advance to playoffs
9	Academic Plovdiv	32	13	19	2620	2700	−80	45	
10	Yambol	32	12	20	2545	2711	−166	44	
11	Minyor 2015	32	11	21	2476	2607	−131	43	
12	Beroe	32	8	24	2577	3027	−450	40	

Source: NBL

=== Results ===
==== Matches 1–22 ====
Teams played each other twice, once at home and once away.

Home \ Away	ACP	BAL	BER	CMT	CHE	CSS	LEV	MIN	RIL	SHU	SPA	YAM
Academic		75–73	86–80	108–97	66–79	70–87	76–78	90–72	69–65	84–76	66–85	89–96
Balkan	86–85		97–60	86–80	85–77	86–95	79–75	86–74	81–70	88–83	89–85	80–67
Beroe	87–86	75–74		80–100	74–86	92–98	76–86	94–79	70–82	90–85	79–81	104–80
Cherno More	93–87	89–81	94–76		75–78	91–84	66–94	86–69	75–97	97–90	69–83	93–89
Chernomorets	93–85	90–81	86–74	83–76		95–82	84–72	101–66	74–65	85–83	91–70	86–62
CSKA Sofia	93–74	78–88	99–86	99–64	79–84		81–67	78–85	85–86	90–72	83–79	80–62
Levski	72–62	69–64	67–68	75–79	79–90	72–85		73–78	76–78	67–85	65–86	82–93
Minyor 2015	93–83	67–85	92–79	88–81	82–80	76–82	59–60		70–97	86–92	72–84	76–67
Rilski Sportist	90–63	69–64	86–82	79–60	69–67	79–78	88–70	95–49		75–86	88–87	96–76
Shumen	78–80	90–96	76–92	82–91	78–89	86–82	76–61	70–65	87–98		95–101	79–80
Spartak	97–71	88–78	112–80	89–85	75–78	80–76	83–68	92–57	97–95	89–86		80–67
Yambol	91–83	72–75	83–98	89–81	66–100	75–90	81–73	77–69	75–87	74–82	97–86	

Source: NBL
Legend: Blue = home team win; Red = away team win.
Matches with lighter background shading were decided after overtime.

==== Matches 23–32 ====
After 22 matches, the league split into two groups (the top six and the bottom six). Each team plays every other team in their group twice (once at home and once away).

===== Top six =====
Home \ Away	BAL	CMT	CHE	CSS	RIL	SPA
Balkan		80–68	71–95	86–59	86–79	72–67
Cherno More	79–95		89–81	91–99	60–107	86–90
Chernomorets	89–90	89–59		78–68	88–87	87–80
CSKA Sofia	80–92	105–99	78–94		77–87	78–82
Rilski Sportist	89–62	98–76	80–78	92–84		88–80
Spartak	90–81	121–75	81–76	102–70	85–81	

Source: NBL
Legend: Blue = home team win; Red = away team win.
Matches with lighter background shading were decided after overtime.

===== Bottom six =====
Home \ Away	ACP	BER	LEV	MIN	SHU	YAM
Academic		125–92	82–91	81–78	89–85	74–72
Beroe	83–113		70–115	66–113	81–123	91–104
Levski	81–73	90–59		84–83	68–79	88–79
Minyor 2015	84–88	106–81	71–72		97–87	91–68
Shumen	88–80	122–74	89–67	67–61		84–71
Yambol	85–77	101–84	79–80	81–68	86–105	

Source: NBL
Legend: Blue = home team win; Red = away team win.
Matches with lighter background shading were decided after overtime.

== Playoffs ==
=== Bracket ===
Quarterfinals
1	Chernomorets	73	88
8	Levski	59	74
4	Balkan Botevgrad	91	77	94
5	CSKA Sofia	76	82	74
2	Rilski Sportist	113	96
7	Shumen	60	67
3	Spartak Pleven	116	74	82
6	Cherno More	83	80	73

Semifinals
1	Chernomorets	79	70	79	78
4	Balkan Botevgrad	84	57	82	94
2	Rilski Sportist	95	71	90	81	84
3	Spartak Pleven	84	77	82	83	52

Finals
4	Balkan Botevgrad	62	97	69	69
2	Rilski Sportist	75	102	68	81
Third place
1	Chernomorets	92	64	87
3	Spartak Pleven	81	77	72

== Player of the round ==
Round	Player	Team	PIR
1	(United States) John Florveus	Levski Sofia	30
2	(Bulgaria) Nikolay Stoyanov	Spartak Pleven	30
3	(United States) Alan Arnett	Levski Sofia	23
4	(United States) Brian Cameron	Shumen	38
5	(Estonia) Karl-Johan Lips	Balkan	36
6	(United States) Brian Cameron	Shumen	35
7	(Bulgaria) Georgi Boyanov	CSKA Sofia	37
8	(United States) Averyl Ugba	Cherno More	34
9	(Bulgaria) Stanimir Marinov	Spartak Pleven	31
10	(Bulgaria) Georgi Boyanov	CSKA Sofia	41
11	(United States) Darrell Davis	Beroe	44
12	(United States) Darrell Davis	Beroe	37
13	(United States) Darrell Davis	Beroe	46
14	(United States) Peter Kiss	Yambol	33
15	(United States) Carlos Pepin	Beroe	55
16	(Bosnia and Herzegovina) Aleksandar Radukić	CSKA Sofia	33
17	(United States) Brian Cameron	Shumen	34
18	(United States) Darrell Davis	Beroe	47
19	(United States) Peter Kiss	Yambol	45
20	(Bosnia and Herzegovina) Aleksandar Radukić	CSKA Sofia	49
21	(United States) Averyl Ugba	Cherno More	38
22	(Bosnia and Herzegovina) Aleksandar Radukić	CSKA Sofia	38
23	(Bulgaria) Nikolay Nikolov	Beroe	36
24	(Bulgaria) Maksim Bochev	Levski	31
25	(Bulgaria) Nikolay Titkov	Beroe	38
26	(Canada) Karim Mané	Shumen	36
27	(Bulgaria) Georgi Boyanov	CSKA Sofia	39
28	(Canada) Karim Mané	Shumen	38
29	(Bulgaria) Maksim Bochev	Levski	40
30	(Bulgaria) Ivan Lilov	Yambol	32
31	(Canada) Karim Mané	Shumen	36
32	(Bulgaria) Georgi Boyanov	CSKA Sofia	46

== Bulgarian clubs in European competitions ==
Team	Competition	Progress
Balkan	FIBA Europe Cup	Second round
Chernomorets	FIBA Europe Cup	Qualifying tournament

== Bulgarian clubs in Regional competitions ==
Team	Competition	Progress
Spartak Pleven	European North Basketball League	Regular season
