= 2021–22 National Basketball League (Bulgaria) season =

NBL
- Duration: 9 October 2021 – 9 June 2022
- Games played: 135 (Regular season)
- Teams: 10
- TV partner(s): Max Sport

Regular season
- Season MVP: Trey Porter

Finals
- Champions: Balkan Botevgrad
- Runners-up: Rilski Sportist
- Third place: Levski Lukoil
- Fourth place: Spartak Pleven
- Finals MVP: Christian Jones

Statistical leaders
- Points: Jeremiah Littlepage 19.7
- Rebounds: Tonny Trocha-Morelos 12.8
- Assists: Jordan Burns 7.0
- Index Rating: Trey Porter 25.7

Records
- Biggest home win: Rilski Sportist 108–56 Shumen (29 December 2021)
- Biggest away win: Beroe 76–125 Rilski Sportist (6 April 2022)
- Highest scoring: Levski Lukoil 108–114 Spartak Pleven (16 April 2022)

The 2021–22 National Basketball League (Bulgaria) season is the 81st season of the Bulgarian NBL.

== Teams ==
2021–22 Bulgarian National Basketball League club locations.

Club	Last season	Arena	Location	Capacity
Academic Plovdiv	5th	Kolodruma	Plovdiv	6,100
Balkan Botevgrad	4th	Arena Botevgrad	Botevgrad	4,500
Beroe	6th	Municipal Hall	Stara Zagora	1,000
Cherno More Ticha	9th	Hristo Borisov	Varna	1,000
Chernomorets	5th	Boycho Branzov Hall	Burgas	1,000
Levski Lukoil	1st	Universiada Hall	Sofia	4,000
Rilski Sportist	2nd	Arena Samokov	Samokov	2,500
Shumen	New team	Arena Shumen	Shumen	1,500
Spartak Pleven	8th	Balkanstroy	Pleven	1,200
Yambol	7th	Diana	Yambol	3,000

== Regular season ==
In the regular season, teams play against each other three times home-and-away in a double round-robin format. The draw for the first 18 rounds, was made on 10 September and was show in the NBL youtube channel. The season will start on 9 October. The top eight teams advance to the playoffs.

=== League table ===
Pos	Team	Pld	W	L	PF	PA	PD	Pts	Qualification
1	Rilski Sportist	27	25	2	2458	1932	+526	52	Advance to playoffs
2	Balkan Botevgrad	27	21	6	2243	1952	+291	48	Advance to playoffs
3	Levski Lukoil	27	18	9	2230	1980	+250	45	Advance to playoffs
4	Chernomorets	27	16	11	2199	2119	+80	43	Advance to playoffs
5	Spartak Pleven	27	16	11	2298	2184	+114	43	Advance to playoffs
6	Beroe	27	13	14	2191	2239	−48	40	Advance to playoffs
7	Academic Plovdiv	27	12	15	2155	2186	−31	39	Advance to playoffs
8	Yambol	27	9	18	2214	2441	−227	36	Advance to playoffs
9	Shumen	27	4	23	1875	2362	−487	31	
10	Cherno More Ticha	27	1	26	1957	2425	−468	28	

Updated to match(es) played on 27 April 2022. Source: NBL

=== Results ===
Home \ Away	ACP	BAL	BER	CMT	CHE	LEV	RIL	SHU	SPA	YAM	ACP	BAL	BER	CMT	CHE	LEV	RIL	SHU	SPA	YAM
Academic		63–99	84–78	91–79	88–91	78–97	81–88	83–78	77–85	106–80		70–65		89–85			67–80	79–66		113–88
Balkan	79–63		106–78	88–69	49–59	80–69	74–73	112–76	90–81	94–81			85–76		92–70	74–68			75–71	
Beroe	91–87	92–87		99–64	100–83	56–82	79–90	85–63	57–73	91–76	95–87			74–64			76–125	105–68		76–92
Cherno More	65–83	79–101	80–82		83–108	72–101	75–86	71–76	69–85	78–77		72–84			79–99	73–92	71–93		82–91	
Chernomorets	80–66	83–78	76–58	91–70		69–96	68–89	114–63	84–87	110–78	76–66		89–78						79–66	79–72
Levski Lukoil	75–57	59–72	97–85	96–60	77–57		66–76	75–51	80–74	85–81	76–70		86–68		80–69				108–114	
Rilski Sportist	77–63	85–73	85–77	96–58	82–71	88–69		108–56	93–70	104–68		78–74			89–58	82–78			79–77	
Shumen	66–83	54–80	65–81	91–71	68–77	50–96	59–103		71–84	73–82		67–73		66–58	88–85	70–72	75–102			
Spartak	91–64	71–83	76–89	98–66	74–89	84–82	101–93	100–74		88–95	94–90		95–83					92–76		94–73
Yambol	72–93	75–97	76–91	97–91	103–85	78–97	81–101	98–77	83–82			70–79		91–73		78–81	76–115	93–88		

Updated to match(es) played on 27 April 2022. Source: NBL
Legend: Blue = home team win; Red = away team win.

== Playoffs ==
=== Bracket ===
Quarterfinals
1	Rilski Sportist	91	96
8	Yambol	68	83
4	Chernomorets	72	85	69
5	Spartak Pleven	87	84	87
2	Balkan Botevgrad	80	72	61
7	Academic Plovdiv	73	87	55
3	Levski Lukoil	116	87
6	Beroe	74	79

Semifinals
1	Rilski Sportist	94	89	77
5	Spartak Pleven	65	75	76
2	Balkan Botevgrad	80	76	56	78
3	Levski Lukoil	74	72	66	76

Finals
1	Rilski Sportist	78	82	65	54
2	Balkan Botevgrad	69	86	88	66
Third place
5	Spartak Pleven	88	83	62
3	Levski Lukoil	96	73	78

== Player of the round ==
Round	Player	Team	PIR
1	(Bulgaria) Chavdar Kostov	Levski	34
2	(Colombia) Tonny Trocha-Morelos	Chernomorets	46
3	(United States) Jeremiah Paige	Yambol	34
4	(Colombia) Tonny Trocha-Morelos	Chernomorets	39
5	(United States) Trey Porter	Rilski Sportist	37
6	(United States) Brandon Brown	Rilski Sportist	35
7	(United States) Obinna Oleka	Beroe	41
8	(United States) Wendell Lewis	Chernomorets	52
9	(United States) Obinna Oleka	Beroe	50
10	(Bulgaria) Aleksandar Yanev	Beroe	33
11	(United States) Obinna Oleka	Beroe	36
12	(Serbia) Dejan Bjelić	Shumen	40
13	(Bulgaria) Georgi Boyanov	Chernomorets	36
14	(Bulgaria) Chavdar Kostov	Levski	32
15	(United States) Trey Porter	Rilski Sportist	28
16	(Bulgaria) Georgi Boyanov	Chernomorets	38
17	(Bulgaria) Krastan Krastanov	Yambol	32
18	(Serbia) Dejan Bjelić	Shumen	31
19	(Bulgaria) Georgi Boyanov	Chernomorets	40
20	(United States) Brandon Brown	Rilski Sportist	41
21	(Bulgaria) Ivko Ivkov	Spartak Pleven	32
22	(Ukraine) Maksym Kornienko	Spartak Pleven	35
23	(Bulgaria) Georgi Boyanov	Chernomorets	30
24	(United States) Daishon Knight	Academic Plovdiv	36
25	(Bulgaria) Aleksandar Yanev	Beroe	32
26	(Croatia) Vlatko Granić	Chernomorets	34
27	(Ukraine) Maksym Kornienko	Spartak Pleven	33

== Bulgarian clubs in European competitions ==
Team	Competition	Progress
Levski Lukoil	Champions League	First qualifying round
Rilski Sportist	FIBA Europe Cup	Regular season
Academic Plovdiv	FIBA Europe Cup	Qualifying rounds

== NBL clubs in regional competitions ==
Team	Competition	Progress
Academic Plovdiv	Balkan League	First round
Beroe	Balkan League	First round
Balkan	Balkan League	First round
Levski Lukoil	Balkan League	First round
