= Ishmael El-Amin =

American basketball player (born 1998)

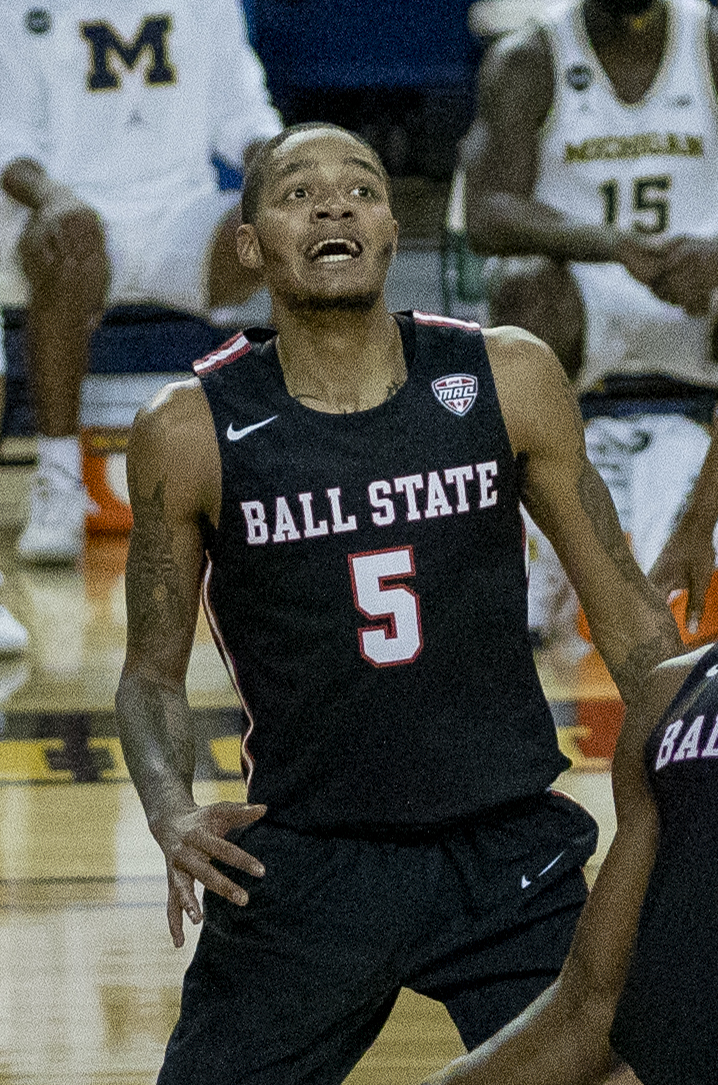
- Ishmael El-Amin with Ball State in 2020

No. 5 – Karşıyaka Basket
- Position: Point guard
- League: Basketbol Süper Ligi

Personal information
- Born: 2 December 1998 (age 27) Minnetonka, Minnesota, US
- Listed height: 1.89 m (6 ft 2 in)
- Listed weight: 80 kg (176 lb)

Career information
- High school: Hopkins (Minnetonka, Minnesota)
- College: Ball State (2017–2021); Rhode Island (2021–2022)
- NBA draft: 2022: undrafted
- Playing career: 2022–present

Career history
- 2022–2023: BC Shumen
- 2023–2024: BK Ventspils
- 2024–2025: Hapoel Gilboa Galil
- 2025–2026: Napoli Basket
- 2026–present: Karşıyaka Basket

Career highlights
- NBL MVP (2023); NBL best scorer (2023); LatEst best scorer (2024)

Ishmael El-Amin (born 2 December 1998) is an American professional basketball player for Karşıyaka Basket of the Turkish Basketbol Süper Ligi (BSL). He plays the point guard position.

== Professional career ==
During his rookie season in the Bulgarian League, El-Amin was named Player of the Round five times. At the end of the season he was the best scorer of the season and was named Season MVP.

In the summer of 2023, he signed for BK Ventspils in Latvian-Estonian Basketball League. He was named MVP of the Month in January, 2024.

On June 26, 2025, he signed with Napoli Basket of the Italian Lega Basket Serie A (LBA).

On August 4, 2026, he signed with Karşıyaka Basket of the Turkish Basketbol Süper Ligi (BSL).

== Personal life ==
He is son of the former UConn and Chicago Bulls player Khalid El-Amin.
