= Eric McGill (basketball) =

American basketball player

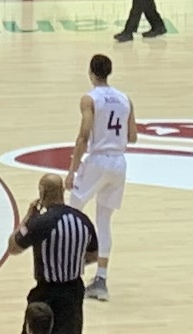

APOEL
- Position: Shooting guard
- League: Cyprus Basketball Division A

Personal information
- Born: December 22, 1996 (age 29)
- Listed height: 6 ft 2 in (1.88 m)
- Listed weight: 180 lb (82 kg)

Career information
- High school: Bartlett (Bartlett, Tennessee)
- College: Southeast Missouri State (2015–2016); Panola (2016–2017); Southern Illinois (2017–2020)
- NBA draft: 2020: undrafted
- Playing career: 2020–present

Career history
- 2020–2021: BC Yambol
- 2021–present: APOEL

Eric McGill (born December 22, 1996) is an American professional basketball player for APOEL of the Cyprus Basketball Division A. He played college basketball for Southeast Missouri State, Panola College, and Southern Illinois.

== High school career ==
McGill grew up in Memphis, Tennessee and attended Bartlett High School. He was a two-time All-District and All-Metro selection and was named MVP of the Florida Go Southern Beach Classic. As a senior, McGill averaged 20 points, six assists and 2.5 steals per game. In AAU play, he competed for Memphis Hoopers. McGill signed with Southeast Missouri State in June 2015.

== College career ==
McGill played his freshman season for Southeast Missouri State, averaging 7.0 points, 2.4 rebounds and 1.8 assists per game and making 13 starts. He transferred to Panola College and averaged 11.6 points, 3.4 rebounds and 5.6 assists per game. He was an honorable mention all-conference performer on a 26-9 team that went to the NJCAA tournament, and he was named to the Region 14 All-Tournament team. McGill scored 20 points in three of the final five games. He committed to Southern Illinois in April 2017. McGill played 10 games in his junior season before breaking his hand against Lamar and missing the rest of the season. McGill averaged 9.5 points, 5.7 rebounds, and 1.6 steals per game as a redshirt junior. He shouldered more responsibility after Aaron Cook Jr. was lost for the season with an injury, and he scored a career-high 27 points in a 68-63 win against Loyola-Chicago on January 29, 2020. As a senior, McGill averaged 11.2 points and 4.5 rebounds per game.

== Professional career ==
On September 20, 2020, McGill signed his first professional contract with BC Yambol of the Bulgarian National Basketball League. He averaged 14 points, 4.1 rebounds, 4.7 assists and 2.2 steals per game. On September 3, 2021, McGill signed with APOEL of the Cyprus Basketball Division A.

== Personal life ==
McGill has three older brothers and an older sister. His mother Pamela works at St. Jude Children's Research Hospital. His father Dan was a basketball coach and a teacher at Northside High School. Dan McGill died when Eric was 11 years old, and his son cited him as his reason for studying economics.
