= Karim Mané =

Canadian basketball player (born 2000)

No. 4 – Saskatoon Mamba
- Position: Point guard
- League: CEBL

Personal information
- Born: May 16, 2000 (age 26) Dakar, Senegal
- Listed height: 6 ft 3 in (1.91 m)
- Listed weight: 190 lb (86 kg)

Career information
- High school: Ecole Secondaire Gérard Filion (Longueuil, Quebec)
- College: Vanier (2017–2020)
- NBA draft: 2020: undrafted
- Playing career: 2020–present

Career history
- 2020–2021: Orlando Magic
- 2021: →Lakeland Magic
- 2021: Memphis Hustle
- 2022: Greensboro Swarm
- 2022: Delaware Blue Coats
- 2024: Shumen
- 2024–2025: ABC Fighters
- 2025: Calgary Surge
- 2025: Rouen Métropole Basket
- 2026–present: Saskatoon Mamba

Career highlights
- NBA G League champion (2021)
- Stats at NBA.com
- Stats at Basketball Reference
Medals
Men's basketball
Representing Senegal
AfroBasket
Bronze medal – third place	2025 Angola

Abdoul Karim Mané (born May 16, 2000) is a Senegalese-Canadian professional basketball player for the Saskatoon Mamba of the Canadian Elite Basketball League (CEBL). He grew up on the South Shore of Montreal and played for Vanier College in Montreal's Ville Saint-Laurent borough, where he was a consensus five-star recruit before forgoing his college eligibility to enter the 2020 NBA draft. Internationally, Mané represents Senegal.

== Early life and career ==
Born in Dakar, Senegal, Mané moved to Canada with his family at age seven. He grew up playing soccer but switched to basketball at age 12. By the time he was 15 years old, he was focusing solely on basketball. Mané developed his skills with the basketball program of École Lucien-Pagé in Montreal. After one season, he began playing for Vanier College, a CEGEP in the Montreal borough of Saint-Laurent. Mané had to commute two hours each way while attending Vanier.

In his second season with Vanier, in 2018–19, he averaged 15.4 points and 6.9 rebounds per game, leading his team to a 16–0 regular season record and the Quebec Student Sport Federation (RSEQ) title. Mané was named RSEQ Player of the Year and earned Canadian Collegiate Athletic Association (CCAA) All-Canadian honors. In his following season, he averaged 15.9 points, 7.9 rebounds and 5.4 assists per game, leading Vanier to a 16–2 record and a second straight RSEQ championship. He was again named CCAA All-Canadian. On April 23, 2020, Mané declared for the 2020 NBA draft without hiring an agent. On July 16, he announced that he would sign an agent and remain in the draft, forgoing his college eligibility.

=== Recruiting ===
College recruiting
Name	Hometown	School	Height	Weight	Commit date
Karim Mané; PG	Montreal, QC	Vanier College (QC)	6 ft 5 in (1.96 m)	218 lb (99 kg)	—
Karim Mané; PG	Recruit ratings: Rivals: 247Sports: ESPN: (90)				
Overall recruit ranking: 247Sports: 29
Note: In many cases, Scout, Rivals, 247Sports, On3, and ESPN may conflict in their listings of height and weight.; In these cases, the average was taken. ESPN grades are on a 100-point scale.; Sources: "2020 Team Ranking". Rivals.

== Professional career ==
=== Orlando / Lakeland Magic (2020–2021) ===
After going undrafted in the 2020 NBA draft, Mané signed a two-way contract with the Orlando Magic on November 27, 2020. He played 10 games with Orlando and 15 with Lakeland, helping the latter win the G League championship with averages of 5.5 points, 5.2 rebounds and 2.0 assists in 22.3 minutes. On April 13, 2021, he was waived by Orlando.

=== Memphis Hustle (2021) ===
On October 23, 2021, Mané was selected by the Memphis Hustle 29th overall in the 2021 NBA G League draft. Mané was waived by the Hustle on January 15, 2022.

=== Greensboro Swarm (2022) ===
On February 21, 2022, Mané was acquired via available player pool by the Greensboro Swarm. On March 12, 2022, he was waived.

=== Delaware Blue Coats (2022) ===
On March 20, 2022, Mané was acquired via available player pool by the Delaware Blue Coats. On December 25, 2022, Mané was waived.

=== Shumen (2024) ===
On March 2, 2024, Mané signed with Shumen of the National Basketball League.

=== ABC Fighters (2024) ===
In September 2024, Mané joined Ivorian champions ABC Fighters, as he joined them for the Road to BAL season. He was the first Fighters player to have ever played in the NBA.

=== Calgary Surge (2025) ===
On April 11, 2025, Mané signed a one-year contract with the Calgary Surge of the Canadian Elite Basketball League. On July 4, the Surge announced Mané would be departing the team to join the Senegalese National Basketball team.

=== Rouen Métropole Basket (2025) ===
On August 31, 2025, Mané signed with Rouen Métropole Basket of the LNB Pro B.

=== Saskatoon Mamba (2026–present) ===
On April 30, 2026, Mané signed with the Saskatoon Mamba of the Canadian Elite Basketball League.

== National team career ==
Mané represented Canada at the 2019 FIBA Under-19 World Cup in Heraklion. He averaged 11.7 points, 4.4 rebounds and 3.1 assists, helping his team finish in ninth place.

== Career statistics ==
Legend
GP	Games played	GS	Games started	MPG	Minutes per game
FG%	Field goal percentage	3P%	3-point field goal percentage	FT%	Free throw percentage
RPG	Rebounds per game	APG	Assists per game	SPG	Steals per game
BPG	Blocks per game	PPG	Points per game	**Bold**	Career high

=== NBA ===
==== Regular season ====
Year	Team	GP	GS	MPG	FG%	3P%	FT%	RPG	APG	SPG	BPG	PPG
2020–21	Orlando	10	0	8.8	.231	.500	.800	1.4	.4	.0	.2	1.1
Career		10	0	8.8	.231	.500	.800	1.4	.4	.0	.2	1.1
