= 2020 NBA draft =

Basketball player selection

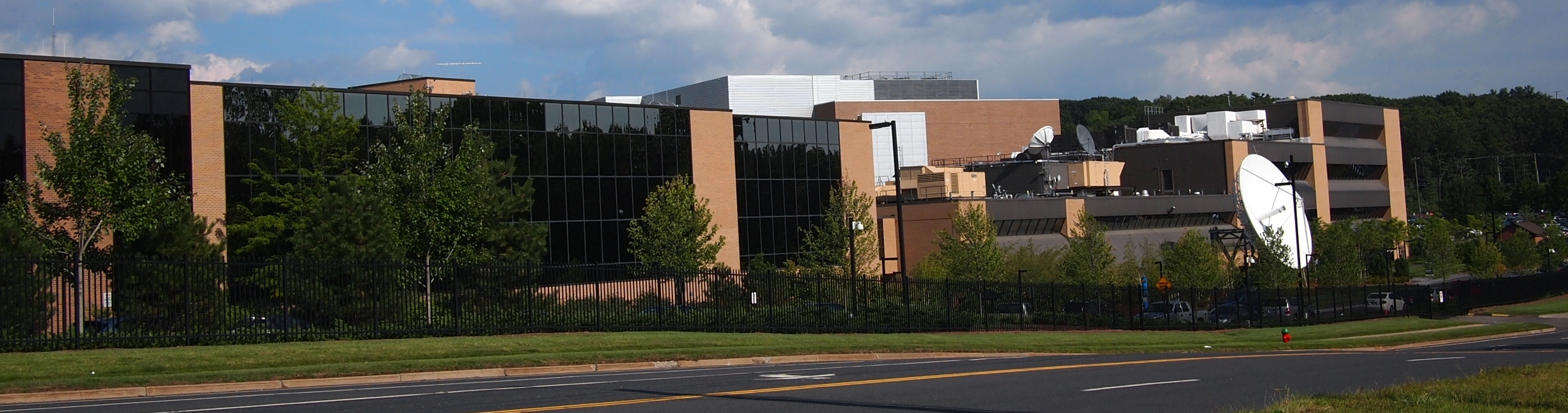
- ESPN's facilities hosted the 2020 NBA draft

General information
- Sport: Basketball
- Date: November 18, 2020
- Location: ESPN Studios (Bristol, Connecticut; draft held via conference call)
- Networks: ESPN; Yahoo Sports

Overview
- 60 total selections in 2 rounds
- League: NBA
- First selection: Anthony Edwards (Minnesota Timberwolves)

The 2020 NBA draft was held on November 18, 2020 as the 74th edition of the draft. The National Basketball Association (NBA) teams took turns selecting amateur United States college basketball players and other eligible players, including international players. It was televised nationally on ESPN. The draft was originally scheduled to be held at Barclays Center in Brooklyn on June 25, but due to the COVID-19 pandemic, it was instead conducted at ESPN's facilities in Bristol, Connecticut and was delayed to November, with the event held via videoconferencing. The draft lottery was originally scheduled to take place on May 19, 2020, but due in part to the 2020 NBA Bubble, it was rescheduled to take place on August 20, 2020, instead. This was the first draft since 1975 to not be held in June, as well as the first draft to be held at a time later than the month of June. This draft also featured the lack of a proper "green room" due to pandemic restrictions. The first pick was made by the Minnesota Timberwolves, who selected Anthony Edwards out of Georgia.

== Draft selections ==
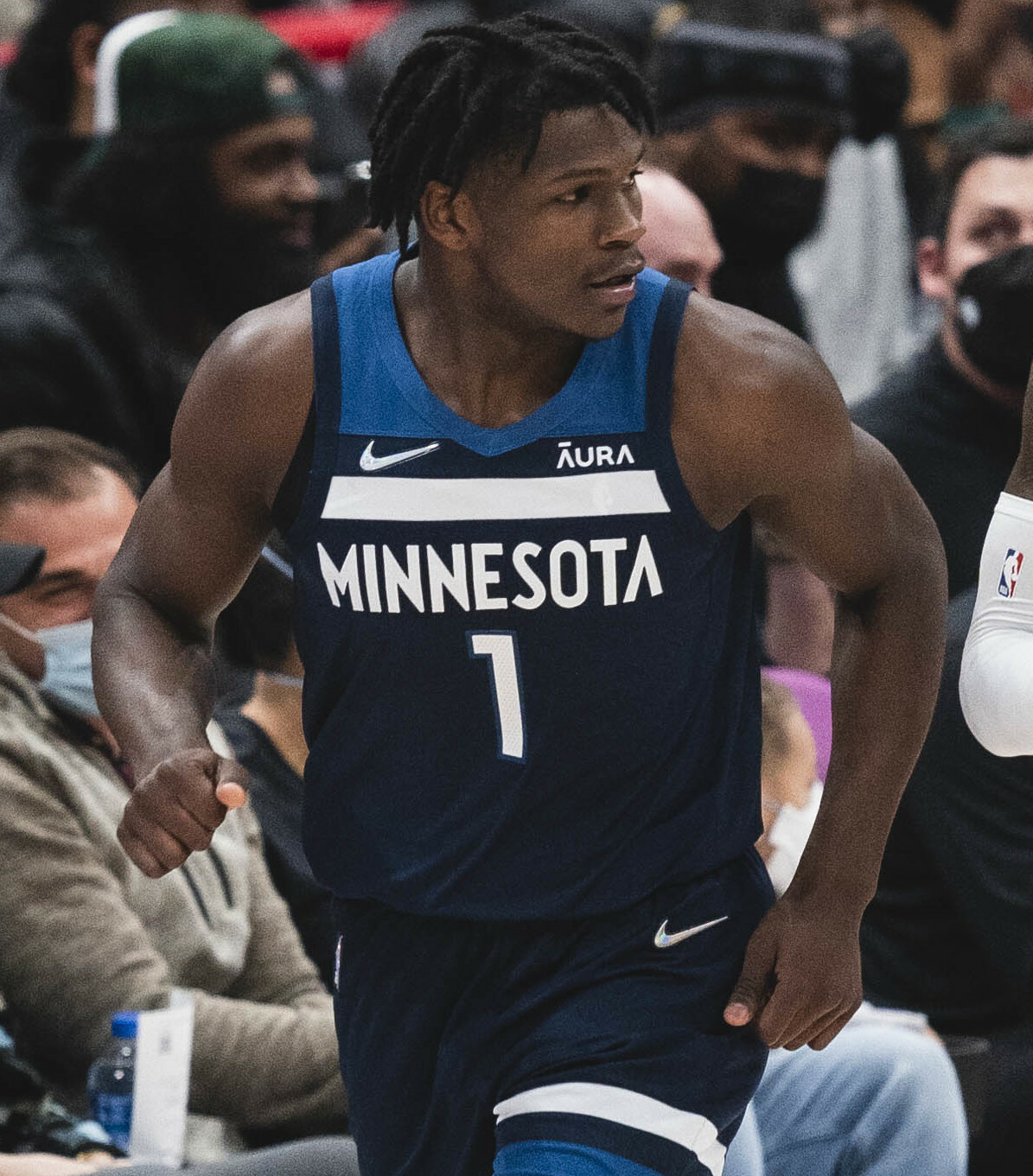
Anthony Edwards was selected 1st overall by the Minnesota Timberwolves.

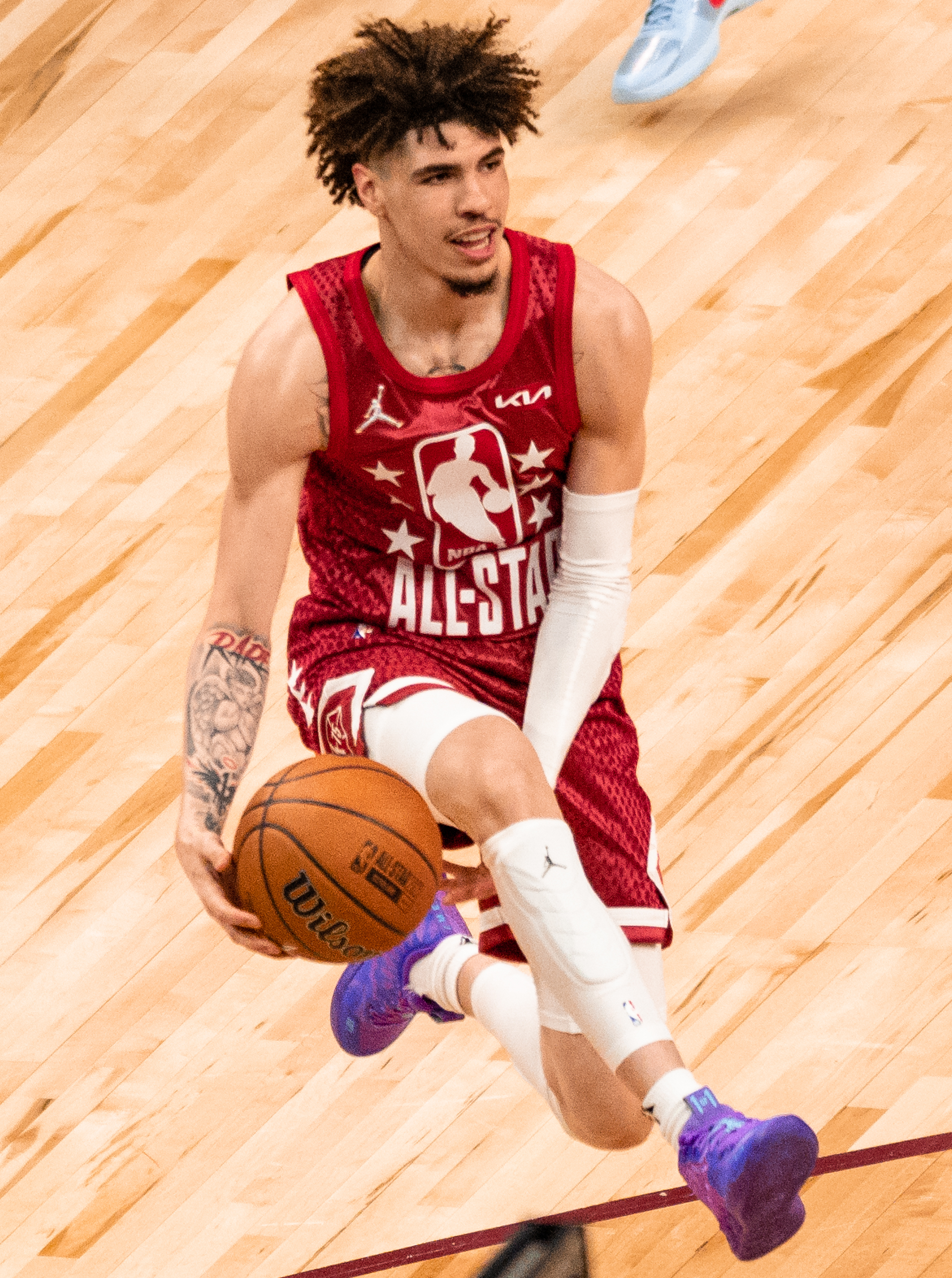
LaMelo Ball was selected 3rd overall by the Charlotte Hornets.

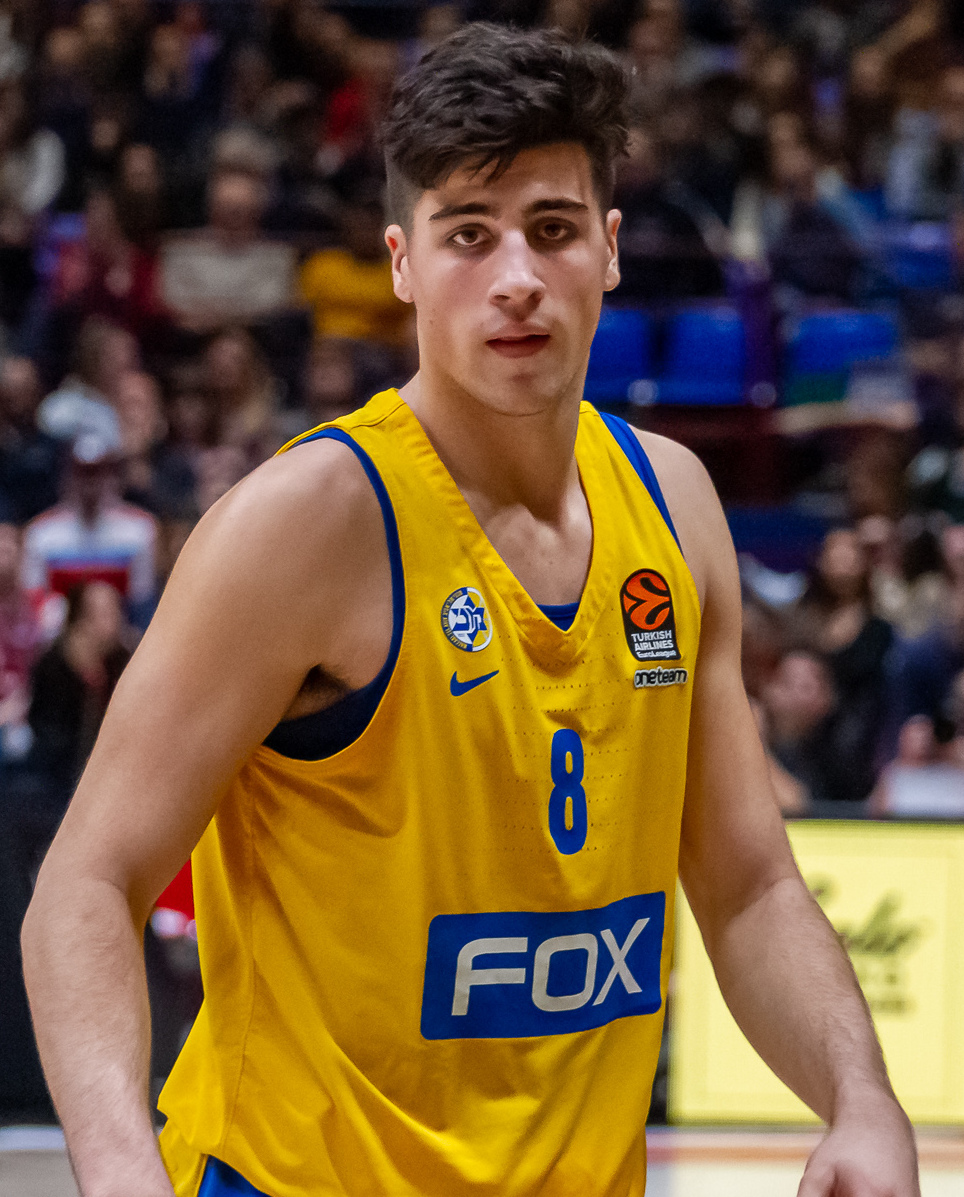
Deni Avdija was selected 9th overall by the Washington Wizards.

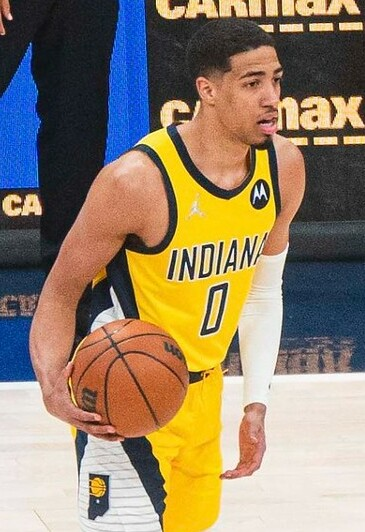
Tyrese Haliburton was selected 12th overall by the Sacramento Kings.

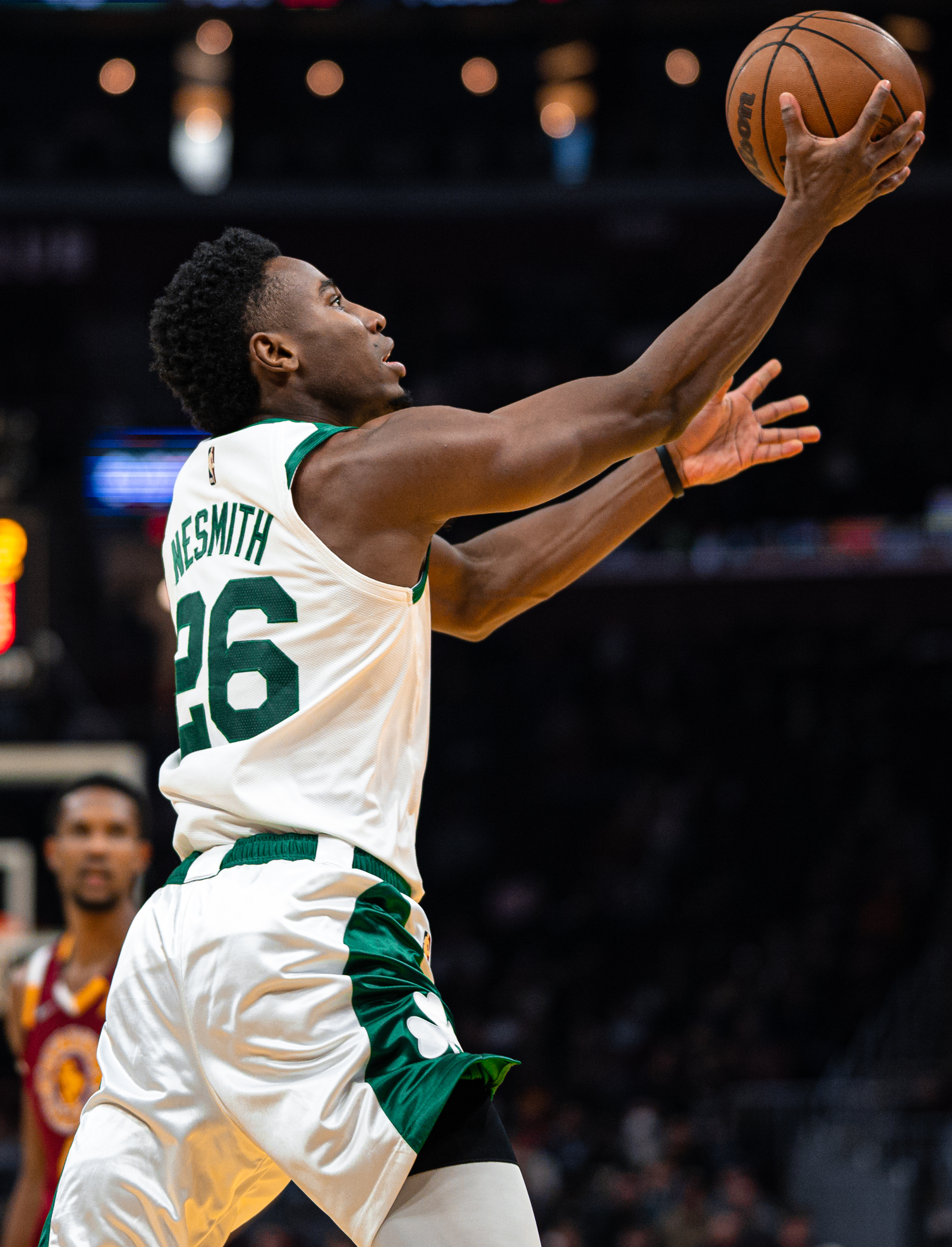
Aaron Nesmith was selected 14th overall by the Boston Celtics.

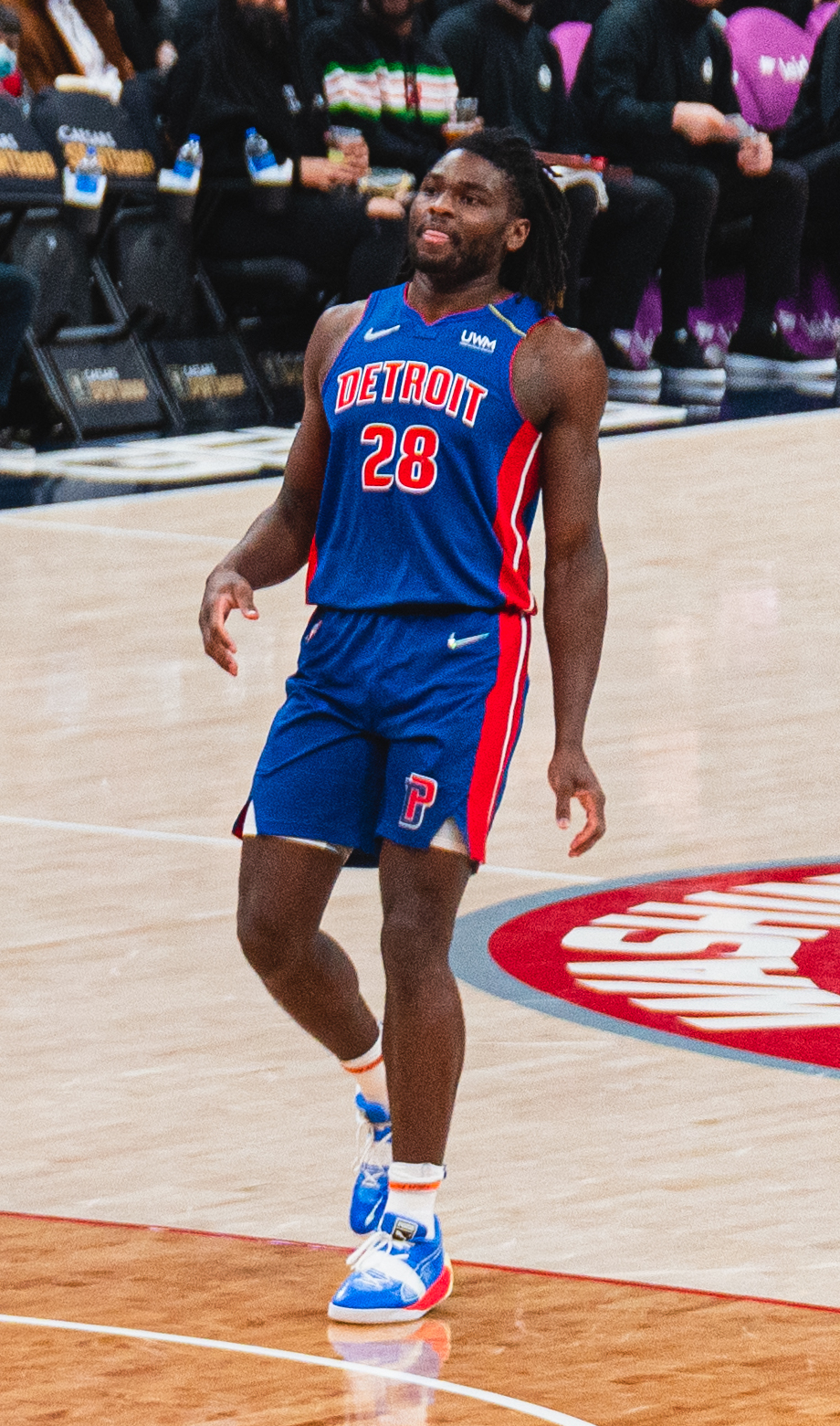
Isaiah Stewart was selected 16th overall by the Portland Trail Blazers (traded to the Detroit Pistons via the Houston Rockets).

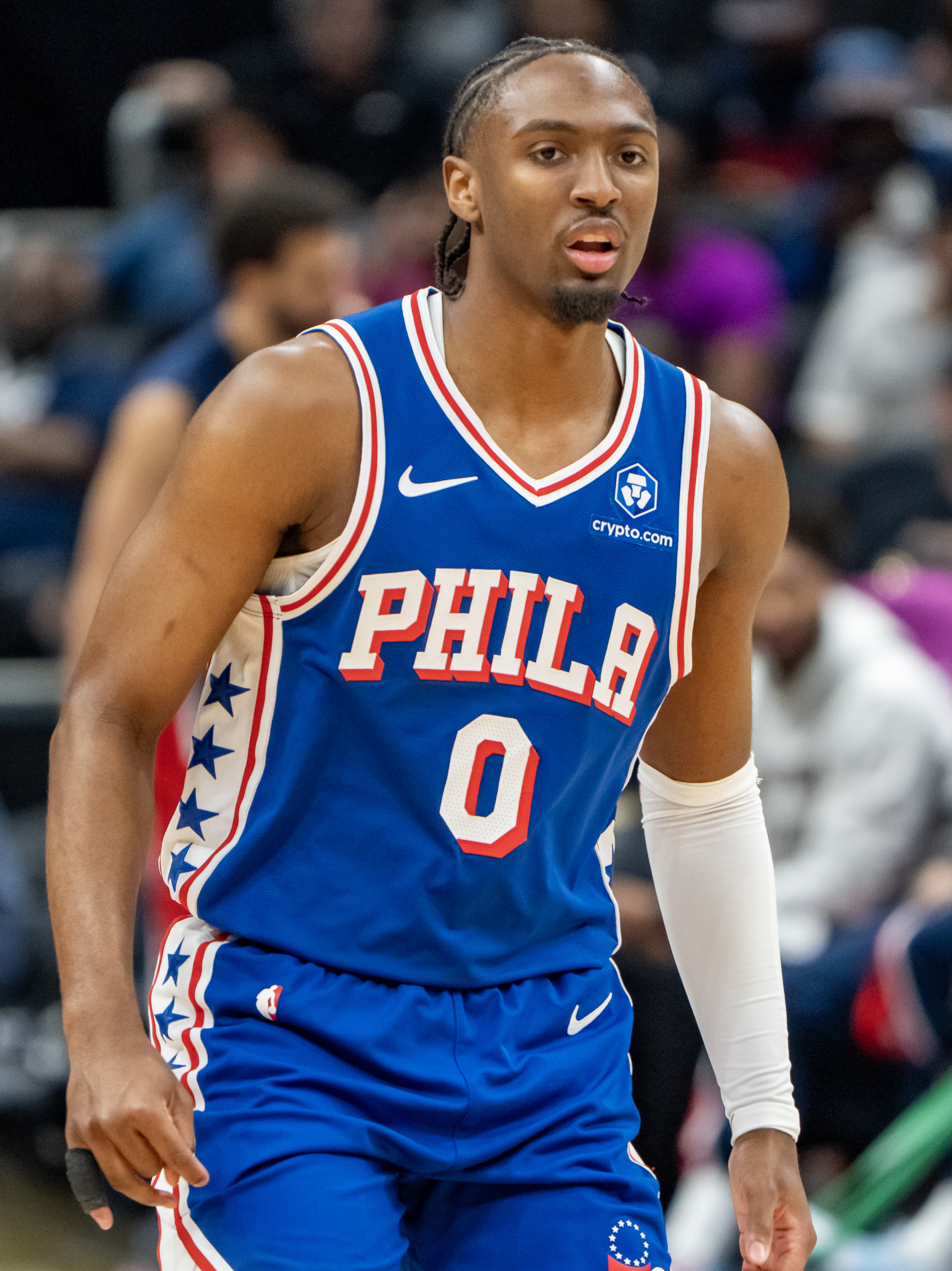
Tyrese Maxey was selected 21st overall by the Philadelphia 76ers.

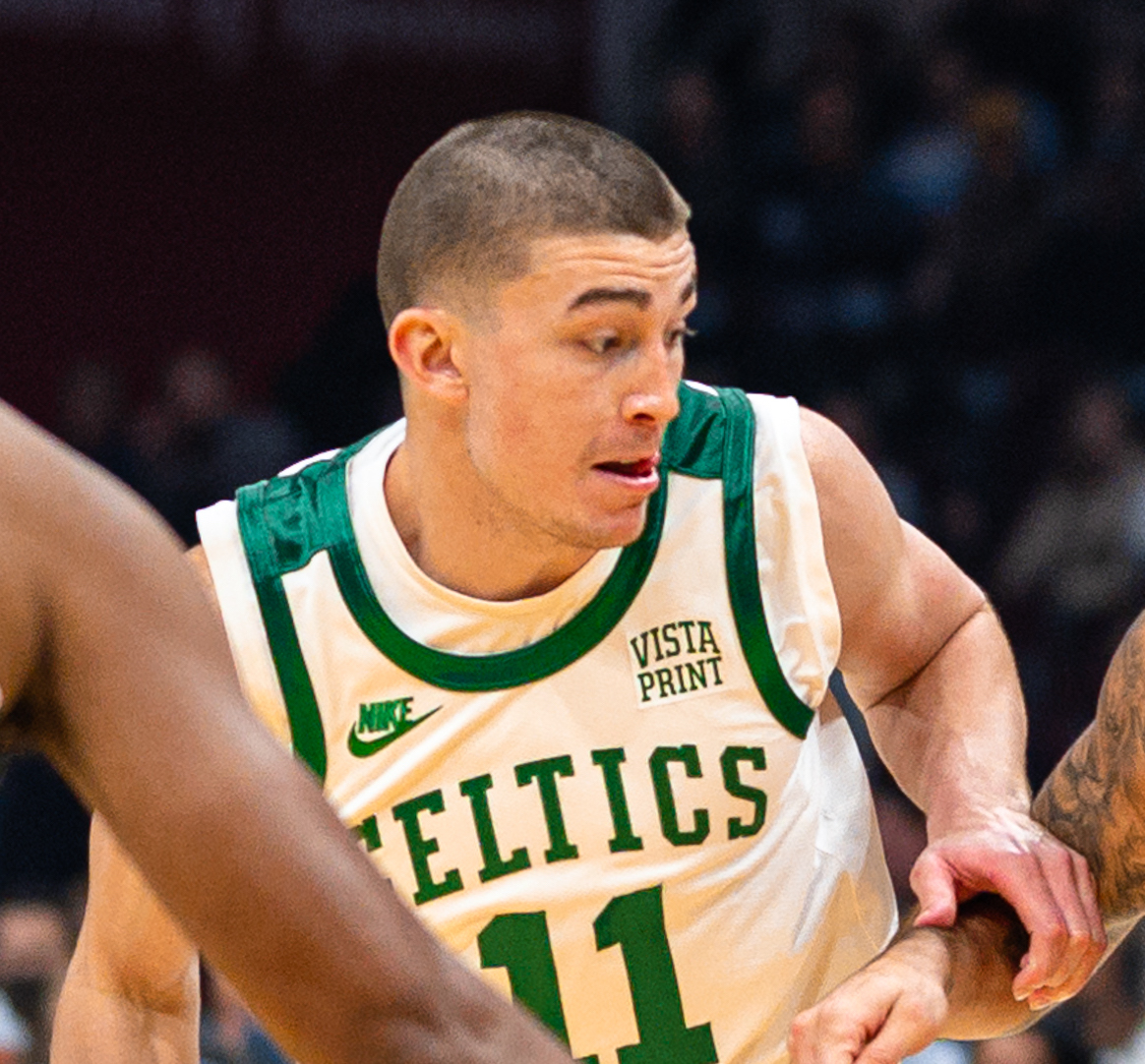
Payton Pritchard was selected 26th overall by the Boston Celtics.

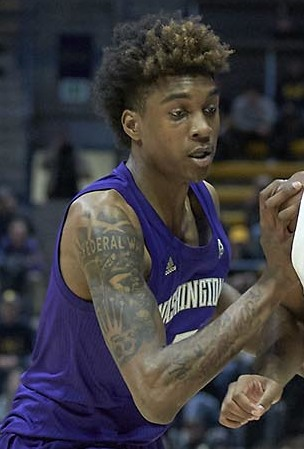
Jaden McDaniels was selected 28th overall by the Los Angeles Lakers (traded to the Minnesota Timberwolves via the Oklahoma City Thunder).

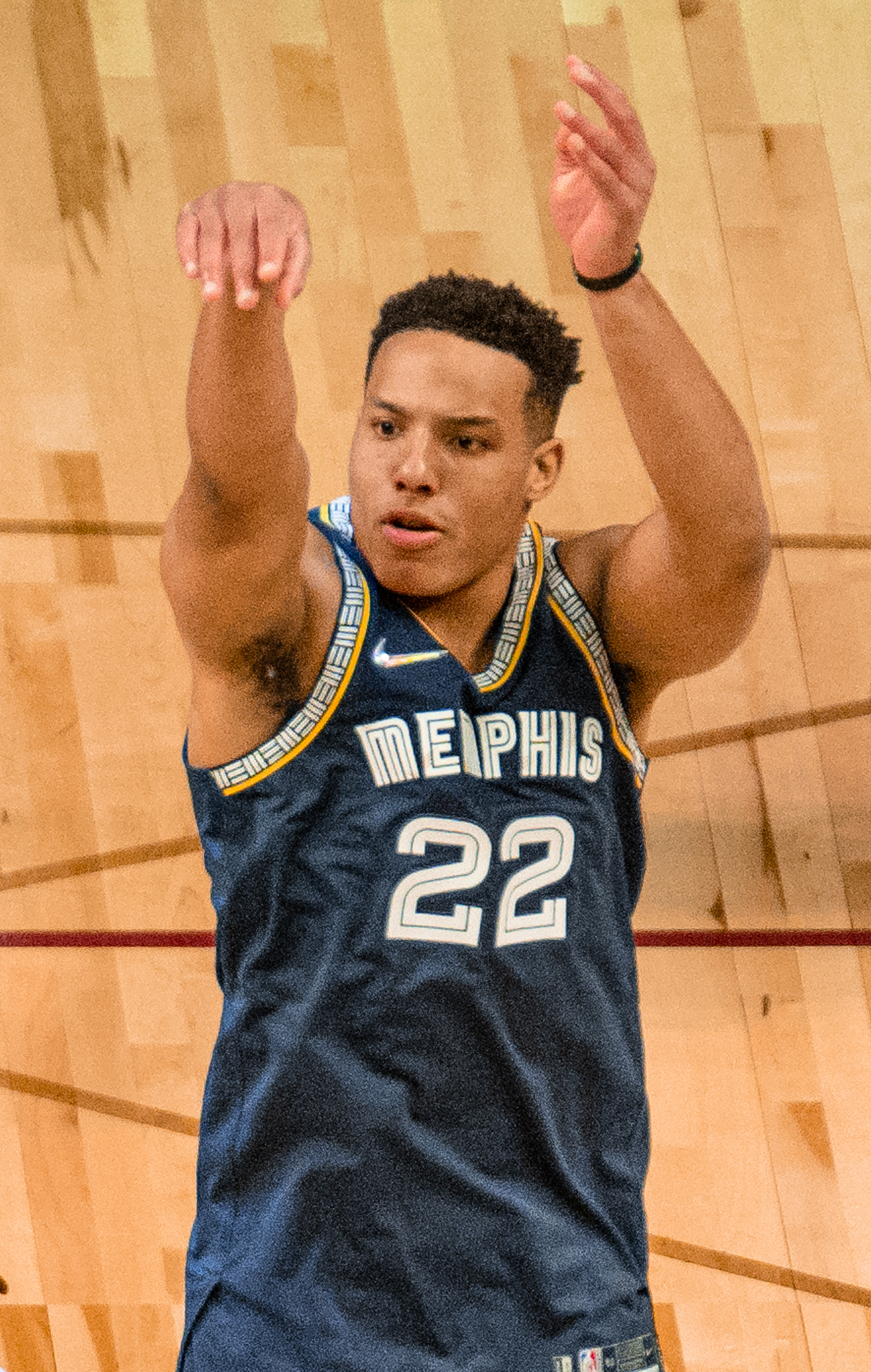
Desmond Bane was selected 30th overall by the Boston Celtics (traded to the Memphis Grizzlies).

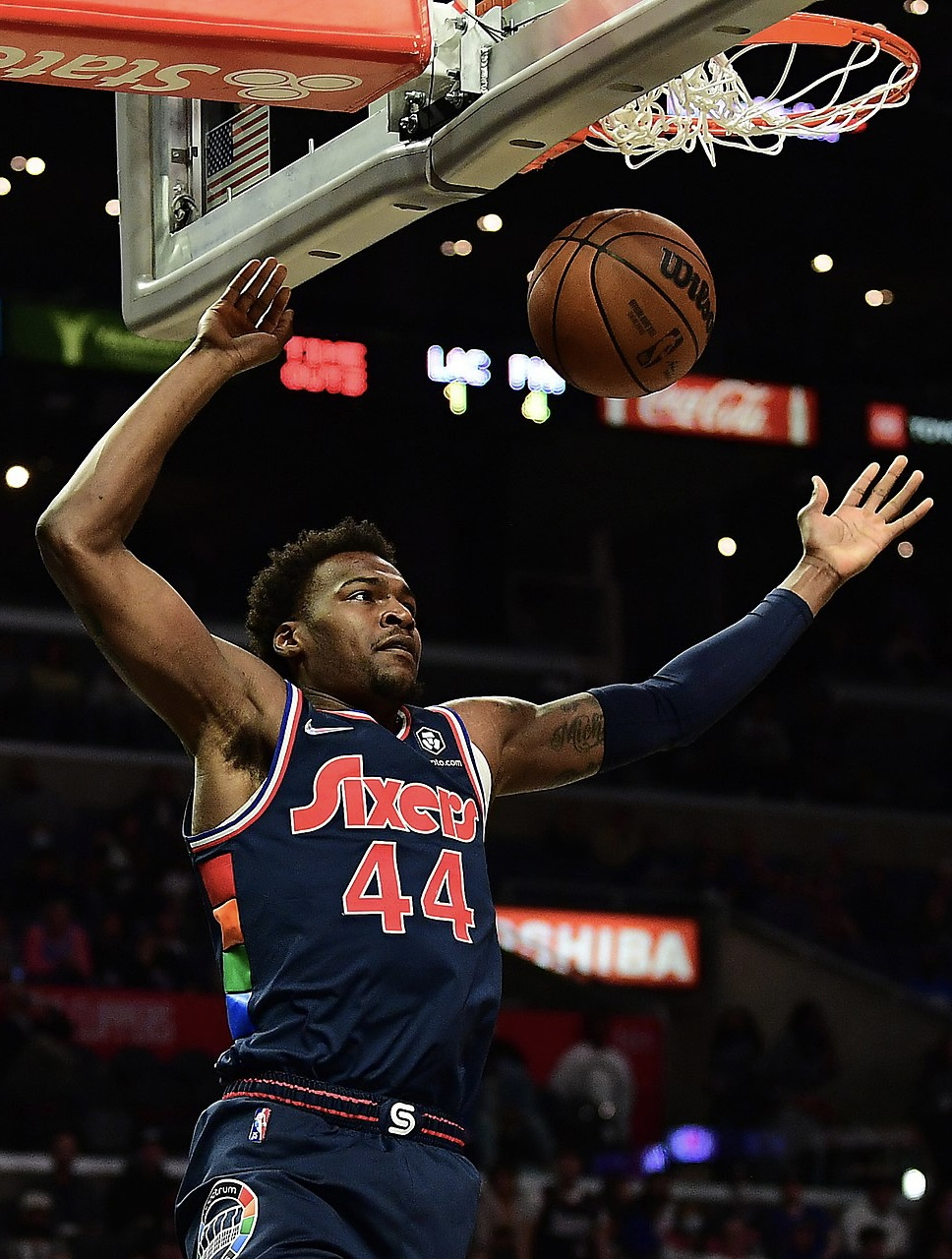
Paul Reed was selected 58th overall by the Philadelphia 76ers.

PG	Point guard	SG	Shooting guard	SF	Small forward	PF	Power forward	C	Center

*	Denotes player who has been selected for at least one All-Star Game and All-NBA Team
^{+}	Denotes player who has been selected for at least one All-Star Game
^{x}	Denotes player who has been selected for at least one All-NBA Team
^{#}	Denotes player who has never appeared in an NBA regular-season or playoff game
^{~}	Denotes player who has been selected as Rookie of the Year

Rnd.	Pick	Player	Pos.	Nationality (Note: Nationality indicates the player's national team or representative nationality. If a player has not competed at the international level, then the nationality indicates the national team that the player is eligible to represent according to FIBA rules.)	Team	School / club team
1	1	Anthony Edwards*	SG	United States	Minnesota Timberwolves	Georgia (Fr.)
1	2	James Wiseman	C	United States	Golden State Warriors	Memphis (Fr.)
1	3	LaMelo Ball^{~+}	PG	United States	Charlotte Hornets	Illawarra Hawks (Australia)
1	4	Patrick Williams	SF	United States	Chicago Bulls	Florida State (Fr.)
1	5	Isaac Okoro	SF	United States	Cleveland Cavaliers	Auburn (Fr.)
1	6	Onyeka Okongwu	PF	United States	Atlanta Hawks	USC (Fr.)
1	7	Killian Hayes	PG	France (Note: Hayes was born in the United States to an American father and French mother; he was raised in France. He holds dual citizenship of both countries but plays for the France national basketball team.)	Detroit Pistons	Ratiopharm Ulm (Germany)
1	8	Obi Toppin	PF	United States	New York Knicks	Dayton (So.)
1	9	Deni Avdija^{+}	SF	Israel (Note: Avdija was born in Israel to a Serbian father. He holds dual citizenship of both countries but plays for the Israel national basketball team.)	Washington Wizards	Maccabi Tel Aviv (Israel)
1	10	Jalen Smith	PF/C	United States	Phoenix Suns	Maryland (So.)
1	11	Devin Vassell	SG	United States	San Antonio Spurs	Florida State (So.)
1	12	Tyrese Haliburton*	PG	United States	Sacramento Kings	Iowa State (So.)
1	13	Kira Lewis Jr.	PG	United States	New Orleans Pelicans	Alabama (So.)
1	14	Aaron Nesmith	SF	United States	Boston Celtics (from Memphis) (Note: January 12, 2015: Memphis Grizzlies to Boston Celtics (three-team trade with New Orleans): Boston acquired Austin Rivers from New Orleans and Tayshaun Prince and a top-6 protected 2020 first-round pick from Memphis; Memphis acquired Jeff Green from Boston; Russ Smith and a traded player exception from New Orleans; New Orleans acquired Quincy Pondexter and a 2015 second-round pick from Memphis)	Vanderbilt (So.)
1	15	Cole Anthony	PG	United States	Orlando Magic	North Carolina (Fr.)
1	16	Isaiah Stewart	PF/C	United States	Portland Trail Blazers (traded to Detroit via Houston) (Note: November 22, 2020: Portland Trail Blazers to Houston Rockets: Houston acquired Trevor Ariza, the draft rights to Isaiah Stewart, and a future conditional first-round pick; Portland acquired Robert Covington; November 24, 2020: Houston Rockets to Detroit Pistons: Detroit acquired Trevor Ariza, the draft rights to Isaiah Stewart, a future second-round pick, and cash considerations; Houston acquired Christian Wood, a protected future first-round draft pick, and a 2021 second-round pick)	Washington (Fr.)
1	17	Aleksej Pokuševski	SF/PF	Serbia	Minnesota Timberwolves (from Brooklyn via Atlanta, (Note: July 6, 2019: Brooklyn Nets to Atlanta Hawks: Atlanta acquired Allen Crabbe, the draft rights to Nickeil Alexander-Walker, and a lottery protected 2020 first-round pick; Brooklyn acquired Taurean Prince and a 2021 second-round pick) (Note: February 5, 2020: Minnesota Timberwolves to Denver Nuggets (four-team trade with Atlanta and Houston): Minnesota acquired Malik Beasley, Juan Hernangómez, and Jarred Vanderbilt from Denver; Evan Turner and Brooklyn's lottery protected 2020 first-round pick from Atlanta; Denver acquired Keita Bates-Diop, Shabazz Napier, and Noah Vonleh from Minnesota; Gerald Green and a 2020 first-round pick from Houston; Atlanta acquired Clint Capela and Nenê from Houston; Houston acquired Robert Covington and Jordan Bell from Minnesota; Golden State's 2024 second-round pick from Atlanta) traded to Oklahoma City) (Note: November 20, 2020: Minnesota Timberwolves to Oklahoma City Thunder: Oklahoma City acquired James Johnson, the draft rights to Aleksej Pokuševski, and a 2024 second-round pick; Minnesota acquired Ricky Rubio and the draft rights to Jaden McDaniels)	Olympiacos Piraeus B (Greece)
1	18	Josh Green	SG	Australia	Dallas Mavericks	Arizona (Fr.)
1	19	Saddiq Bey	SF	United States	Brooklyn Nets (from Philadelphia via L.A. Clippers, (Note: February 6, 2019: Philadelphia 76ers to Los Angeles Clippers: L.A. Clippers acquired Wilson Chandler, Mike Muscala, Landry Shamet, a lottery protected 2020 first-round pick, Miami's 2021 first-round pick, and Detroit's 2021 and 2023 second-round picks; Philadelphia acquired Tobias Harris, Boban Marjanović, and Mike Scott; June 20, 2019: Los Angeles Clippers to Brooklyn Nets: Brooklyn acquired the draft rights to Jaylen Hands and Philadelphia's lottery protected 2020 first-round pick; L.A. Clippers acquired the draft rights to Mfiondu Kabengele) traded to Detroit) (Note: November 19, 2020: Brooklyn Nets to Detroit Pistons (three-team trade with L.A. Clippers): Detroit acquired the draft rights to Saddiq Bey, Džanan Musa, the draft rights to Jaylen Hands, Rodney McGruder, Toronto's 2021 second-round pick, and cash considerations; Brooklyn acquired Landry Shamet, Bruce Brown, and the draft rights to Reggie Perry; L.A. Clippers acquired the draft rights to Jay Scrubb, Luke Kennard, Justin Patton, Portland's 2023 second-round pick, and Detroit's 2024, 2025, and 2026 second-round picks)	Villanova (So.)
1	20	Precious Achiuwa	PF	Nigeria	Miami Heat	Memphis (Fr.)
1	21	Tyrese Maxey*	PG	United States	Philadelphia 76ers (from Oklahoma City via Philadelphia and Orlando) (Note: November 1, 2016: Oklahoma City Thunder to Philadelphia 76ers: Philadelphia acquired Ersan İlyasova and a top-20 protected 2020 first-round pick; Oklahoma City acquired Jerami Grant) (Note: June 22, 2017: Philadelphia 76ers to Orlando Magic: Orlando acquired Oklahoma City's top-20 protected 2020 first-round pick and Brooklyn's 2020 second-round pick; Philadelphia acquired the draft rights to Anžejs Pasečņiks) (Note: February 7, 2019: Orlando Magic to Philadelphia 76ers: Philadelphia regained Oklahoma City's top-20 protected 2020 first-round pick; acquired Jonathon Simmons and Cleveland's 2019 second-round pick; Orlando acquired Markelle Fultz)	Kentucky (Fr.)
1	22	Zeke Nnaji	PF/C	United States	Denver Nuggets (from Houston)	Arizona (Fr.)
1	23	Leandro Bolmaro	SF	Argentina	New York Knicks (from Utah, (Note: November 18, 2020: Utah Jazz to New York Knicks: New York acquired the 2020 #23 overall pick and the draft rights to Ante Tomić; Utah acquired the 2020 #27 overall pick and the 2020 #38 pick) traded to Minnesota) (Note: November 20, 2020: New York Knicks to Minnesota Timberwolves: Minnesota acquired the draft rights to Leandro Bolmaro; New York acquired the draft rights to Mathias Lessort and Detroit's 2023 second-round selection)	FC Barcelona (Spain)
1	24	R. J. Hampton	SG	United States	Milwaukee Bucks (from Indiana, (Note: July 6, 2019: Indiana Pacers to Milwaukee Bucks: Milwaukee acquired a lottery protected 2020 first-round pick, a future protected second-round pick, and a 2025 second-round pick; Indiana acquired Malcolm Brogdon via sign and trade) traded to Denver) (Note: November 24, 2020: Milwaukee Bucks to Denver Nuggets (four-team trade with New Orleans Pelicans and Oklahoma City Thunder: Denver acquired the draft rights to R. J. Hampton; Milwaukee acquired Jrue Holiday and the draft rights to Sam Merrill; New Orleans acquired Steven Adams, Eric Bledsoe, two future first-round selections from Milwaukee, and the right to swap two first-round selections with Milwaukee; Oklahoma City acquired George Hill, Zylan Cheatham, Josh Gray, Darius Miller, and Kenrich Williams, a future first-round selection from Denver, and second-round selections from New Orleans (2023 via Washington and 2024 via Charlotte))	New Zealand Breakers (Australia)
1	25	Immanuel Quickley	SG	United States	Oklahoma City Thunder (from Denver, (Note: July 8, 2019: Denver Nuggets to Oklahoma City Thunder: Oklahoma City acquired a top-10 protected 2020 first-round pick; Denver acquired Jerami Grant) traded to New York)	Kentucky (So.)
1	26	Payton Pritchard	PG	United States	Boston Celtics	Oregon (Sr.)
1	27	Udoka Azubuike	C	Nigeria	Utah Jazz (from L.A. Clippers via New York) (Note: February 6, 2020: Los Angeles Clippers to New York Knicks (three-team trade with Washington): New York acquired the draft rights to Issuf Sanon from Washington; Maurice Harkless, the L.A. Clippers' 2020 first-round pick, a protected 2021 first-round pick swap, and the Detroit Pistons' 2021 second-round pick from the L.A. Clippers; The L.A. Clippers acquired Marcus Morris from New York and Isaiah Thomas from Washington; Washington acquired Jerome Robinson from the L.A. Clippers)	Kansas (Sr.)
1	28	Jaden McDaniels	SF	United States	Los Angeles Lakers (traded to Minnesota via Oklahoma City) (Note: November 18, 2020: Los Angeles Lakers to Oklahoma City Thunder: Oklahoma City acquired Danny Green and the draft rights to Jaden McDaniels; The L.A. Lakers acquired Dennis Schröder)	Washington (Fr.)
1	29	Malachi Flynn	PG	United States	Toronto Raptors	San Diego State (Jr.)
1	30	Desmond Bane	SG	United States	Boston Celtics (from Milwaukee via Phoenix, (Note: November 7, 2017: Milwaukee Bucks to Phoenix Suns: Phoenix acquired Greg Monroe, a top-7 protected 2020 first-round pick, and a top-47 protected 2018 second-round pick that failed to convey in that year; Milwaukee acquired Eric Bledsoe; July 6, 2019: Phoenix Suns to Boston Celtics: Boston acquired Milwaukee's top-7 protected 2020 first-round pick; Phoenix acquired Aron Baynes and the draft rights to Ty Jerome) traded to Memphis) (Note: November 20, 2020: Boston Celtics to Memphis Grizzlies (three-team trade with Portland): Memphis acquired Mario Hezonja and the draft rights to Desmond Bane; Boston acquired two future second-round selections from Memphis; Portland acquired Enes Kanter and cash considerations)	TCU (Sr.)
2	31	Tyrell Terry	PG	United States	Dallas Mavericks (from Golden State) (Note: July 7, 2016: Golden State Warriors to Dallas Mavericks: Dallas acquired Andrew Bogut and a 2020 second-round pick; Golden State acquired a top-55 protected 2019 second-round pick that was not conveyed to them)	Stanford (Fr.)
2	32	Vernon Carey Jr.	PF	United States	Charlotte Hornets (from Cleveland via Portland, Orlando, and L.A. Clippers) (Note: July 27, 2015: Cleveland Cavaliers to Portland Trail Blazers: Portland acquired Brendan Haywood, Mike Miller, the Minnesota Timberwolves 2019 second-round pick, and a 2020 second-round pick; Cleveland acquired two traded player exceptions and cash considerations; February 18, 2016: Portland Trail Blazers to Orlando Magic (three-team trade with Cleveland): Orlando acquired Jared Cunningham from Cleveland and Cleveland's 2020 second-round pick from Portland; Portland acquired Anderson Varejão and a 2018 "protected" first-round pick from Cleveland; Cleveland acquired Channing Frye from Orlando; July 15, 2016: Orlando Magic to Los Angeles Clippers: The L.A. Clippers acquired Devyn Marble and Cleveland's 2020 second-round pick; Orlando acquired C. J. Wilcox and cash considerations; June 21, 2018: Los Angeles Clippers to Charlotte Hornets: Charlotte acquired the draft rights to Miles Bridges, Cleveland's 2020 second-round pick, and a 2021 second-round pick; The L.A. Clippers acquired the draft rights to Shai Gilgeous-Alexander)	Duke (Fr.)
2	33	Daniel Oturu	C	United States	Minnesota Timberwolves (traded to L.A. Clippers) (Note: November 19, 2020: Minnesota Timberwolves to Los Angeles Clippers: L.A. Clippers acquired the draft rights to Daniel Oturu; Minnesota acquired the draft rights to Mathias Lessort and Detroit's 2023 second-round pick)	Minnesota (So.)
2	34	Théo Maledon	PG	France	Philadelphia 76ers (from Atlanta) (Note: July 6, 2019: Atlanta Hawks to Philadelphia 76ers: Philadelphia acquired the draft rights to Jordan Bone, a 2020 second-round pick, and the best 2023 second-round pick from either Atlanta, Brooklyn, or Charlotte; Atlanta acquired the draft rights to Bruno Fernando)	ASVEL Villeurbanne (France)
2	35	Xavier Tillman	PF	United States	Sacramento Kings (from Detroit via Phoenix, (Note: July 9, 2015: Detroit Pistons to Phoenix Suns: Phoenix acquired a 2020 second-round pick; Detroit acquired Marcus Morris, Reggie Bullock, and Danny Granger; June 23, 2016: Phoenix Suns to Sacramento Kings, Sacramento acquired the draft rights to Bogdan Bogdanović, Georgios Papagiannis, Skal Labissière, and Detroit's 2020 second-round pick; Phoenix acquired the draft rights to Marquese Chriss) traded to Memphis) (Note: November 19, 2020: Sacramento Kings to Memphis Grizzlies: Memphis acquired the draft rights to Xavier Tillman; Sacramento acquired the draft rights to Robert Woodard II and a 2022 second-round pick)	Michigan State (Jr.)
2	36	Tyler Bey	SF	United States	Philadelphia 76ers (from New York, (Note: June 26, 2015: New York Knicks to Philadelphia 76ers: Philadelphia acquired 2020 and 2021 second-round picks; New York acquired Willy Hernangómez) traded to Dallas) (Note: November 18, 2020: Philadelphia 76ers to Dallas Mavericks: Dallas acquired the draft rights to Tyler Bey and Josh Richardson; Philadelphia acquired Seth Curry)	Colorado (Jr.)
2	37	Vít Krejčí	PG	Czech Republic	Washington Wizards (from Chicago, (Note: July 6, 2019: Chicago Bulls to Washington Wizards: Washington acquired a 2020 second-round pick and an option to swap 2022 second-round picks between Chicago and Detroit via the L.A. Lakers; Chicago acquired Tomáš Satoranský and an option to swap 2022 second-round picks between Chicago and Washington) traded to Oklahoma City) (Note: November 19, 2020: Washington Wizards to Oklahoma City Thunder: Oklahoma City acquired Admiral Schofield and the draft rights to Vít Krejčí; Washington acquired the draft rights to Cassius Winston (selected 53rd overall) and a 2024 second-round pick)	Casademont Zaragoza (Spain)
2	38	Saben Lee	PG	United States	Utah Jazz (from Charlotte via New York, (Note: February 7, 2018: Charlotte Hornets to New York Knicks: New York acquired Johnny O'Bryant III, 2020 and 2021 second-round picks; Charlotte acquired Willy Hernangómez) traded to Detroit) (Note: November 20, 2020: Utah Jazz to Detroit Pistons: Detroit acquired Tony Bradley, and the draft rights to Saben Lee; Utah acquired cash considerations)	Vanderbilt (Jr.)
2	39	Elijah Hughes	SF	United States	New Orleans Pelicans (from Washington via Milwaukee, (Note: July 9, 2015: Washington Wizards to Milwaukee Bucks: Milwaukee acquired a top-55 protected 2020 second-round pick (that later became top-45 protected before removing protections altogether in later trades with Washington); Washington acquired Jared Dudley) (Note: February 7, 2019: Milwaukee Bucks to New Orleans Pelicans (three-team trade with Detroit: New Orleans acquired Stanley Johnson from Detroit and Jason Smith from Milwaukee, Denver's top-55 protected 2019 second-round pick, Milwaukee's 2020 second-round pick, Washington's 2020 and 2021 second-round picks from Milwaukee; Milwaukee acquired Nikola Mirotić from New Orleans; Detroit acquired Thon Maker from Milwaukee) traded to Utah) (Note: November 18, 2020: New Orleans Pelicans to Utah Jazz: Utah acquired the draft rights to Elijah Hughes; New Orleans acquired cash considerations and a future second-round pick)	Syracuse (Jr.)
2	40	Robert Woodard II	SF	United States	Memphis Grizzlies (from Phoenix, (Note: July 7, 2019: Phoenix Suns to Memphis Grizzlies: Memphis acquired Josh Jackson, De'Anthony Melton, a 2020 second-round pick, and a top-35 protected 2021 second-round pick; Phoenix acquired Kyle Korver and Jevon Carter) traded to Sacramento)	Mississippi State (So.)
2	41	Tre Jones	PG	United States	San Antonio Spurs	Duke (So.)
2	42	Nick Richards	C	Jamaica	New Orleans Pelicans (traded to Charlotte) (Note: November 18, 2020: New Orleans Pelicans to Charlotte Hornets: Charlotte acquired the draft rights to Nick Richards; New Orleans acquired a 2024 second-round pick)	Kentucky (Jr.)
2	43	Jahmi'us Ramsey	SG	United States	Sacramento Kings	Texas Tech (Fr.)
2	44	Marko Simonović	C	Montenegro	Chicago Bulls (from Memphis) (Note: January 3, 2019: Memphis Grizzlies to Chicago Bulls: Chicago acquired Wayne Selden Jr., MarShon Brooks, 2019 and 2020 second-round picks; Memphis acquired Justin Holiday)	Mega Soccerbet (Serbia)
2	45	Jordan Nwora	SF	Nigeria (Note: Nwora was born in the United States to a Nigerian father. He holds dual American-Nigerian citizenship and plays for the Nigeria national basketball team.)	Milwaukee Bucks (from Orlando) (Note: November 18, 2020: Orlando Magic to Milwaukee Bucks: Milwaukee acquired the 45th pick; Orlando acquired 2022, 2023, or 2024 and 2026 second-round picks)	Louisville (Jr.)
2	46	C. J. Elleby	SG	United States	Portland Trail Blazers	Washington State (So.)
2	47	Yam Madar^{#}	PG	Israel	Boston Celtics (from Brooklyn via Philadelphia, Orlando, and Charlotte) (Note: December 11, 2014: Brooklyn Nets to Philadelphia 76ers: Philadelphia acquired Andrei Kirilenko, Jorge Gutiérrez, the right to swap around 2018 second-round picks, a 2020 second-round pick, and cash considerations; Brooklyn acquired Brandon Davies and two different traded player exceptions) (Note: July 8, 2018: Orlando Magic to Charlotte Hornets (three-team trade with Chicago): Charlotte acquired Bismack Biyombo, Washington's 2019 second-round pick, and Brooklyn's 2020 second-round pick from Orlando; Orlando acquired Timofey Mozgov from Charlotte and Jerian Grant from Chicago; Chicago acquired Julyan Stone from Charlotte) (Note: July 6, 2019: Charlotte Hornets to Boston Celtics: Boston acquired Kemba Walker via sign and trade, and Brooklyn's 2020 second-round pick; Charlotte acquired Terry Rozier via sign and trade, and a top-53 protected 2020 second-round pick)	Hapoel Tel Aviv (Israel)
2	48	Nico Mannion	PG	Italy	Golden State Warriors (from Dallas via Philadelphia) (Note: February 23, 2017: Dallas Mavericks to Philadelphia 76ers: Philadelphia acquired Andrew Bogut, Justin Anderson, a conditional 2017 second-round pick, and a #55–60 protected 2020 second-round pick; Dallas acquired Nerlens Noel; February 6, 2020: Philadelphia 76ers to Golden State Warriors: Golden State acquired Dallas's #55–60 protected 2020 second-round pick, Denver's 2021 second-round pick, and Toronto's 2022 second-round pick from Philadelphia; Philadelphia acquired Alec Burks and Glenn Robinson III)	Arizona (Fr.)
2	49	Isaiah Joe	SG	United States	Philadelphia 76ers	Arkansas (So.)
2	50	Skylar Mays	PG	United States	Atlanta Hawks (from Miami via Boston and Cleveland) (Note: July 25, 2017: Miami Heat to Boston Celtics: Boston acquired Zoran Dragić, a 2020 second-round pick, and cash considerations; Miami acquired a top-55 protected 2019 second-round pick that did not convey to them; August 30, 2017: Boston Celtics to Cleveland Cavaliers: Cleveland acquired Isaiah Thomas, Jae Crowder, Ante Žižić, Brooklyn's 2018 first-round pick, and Miami's 2020 second-round pick (last pick added as compensation for Thomas' failed physical); Boston acquired Kyrie Irving; February 8, 2018: Cleveland Cavaliers to Sacramento Kings (three-team trade with Utah): Sacramento acquired Joe Johnson and cash considerations from Utah; Iman Shumpert, Miami's 2020 second-round pick, the draft rights to Dimitrios Agravanis, and cash considerations from Cleveland; Cleveland acquired George Hill and the draft rights to Artūras Gudaitis from Sacramento, and Rodney Hood from Utah; Utah acquired Derrick Rose and Jae Crowder from Cleveland, and the right to swap 2024 second-round picks with Cleveland; February 6, 2020: Sacramento Kings to Atlanta Hawks: Atlanta acquired Dewayne Dedmon, Miami's 2020 second-round pick, and Miami's 2021 second-round pick from Sacramento; Sacramento acquired Alex Len and Jabari Parker)	LSU (Sr.)
2	51	Justinian Jessup^{#}	SG	United States	Golden State Warriors (from Utah via Cleveland, Detroit, and Dallas) (Note: November 29, 2018: Utah Jazz to Cleveland Cavaliers: Cleveland acquired Alec Burks, a 2020 second-round pick, and Washington's 2021 second-round pick; Utah acquired Kyle Korver; June 27, 2019: Cleveland Cavaliers to Detroit Pistons: Detroit acquired Utah's 2020 second-round pick, Portland's 2021 and 2023 second-round picks, Miami's top-55 protected 2024 second-round pick, and cash considerations; Cleveland acquired the draft rights to Kevin Porter Jr.; June 27, 2019: Detroit Pistons to Dallas Mavericks: Dallas acquired the draft rights to Isaiah Roby, Utah's 2020 second-round pick, and Portland's 2021 second-round pick; Detroit acquired the draft rights to Deividas Sirvydis; January 25, 2020: Dallas Mavericks to Golden State Warriors: Golden State acquired Utah's 2020 second-round pick; Dallas acquired Willie Cauley-Stein)	Boise State (Sr.)
2	52	Kenyon Martin Jr.	SG	United States	Sacramento Kings (from Houston, (Note: February 7, 2019: Houston Rockets to Sacramento Kings (three-team trade with Cleveland): Sacramento acquired a 2020 second-round pick from Houston and Alec Burks from Cleveland; Houston acquired Iman Shumpert from Sacramento, Nik Stauskas, Wade Baldwin IV, and Milwaukee's 2021 second-round pick from Cleveland; Cleveland acquired Brandon Knight, Marquese Chriss, a 2019 first-round pick, and a 2022 second-round pick from Houston) traded to Houston) (Note: November 25, 2020: Sacramento Kings to Houston Rockets: Houston acquired the draft rights to Kenyon Martin Jr.; Sacramento acquired cash considerations and a future second-round pick (via L.A. Lakers))	IMG Academy (postgraduate)
2	53	Cassius Winston	PG	United States	Oklahoma City Thunder (traded to Washington)	Michigan State (Sr.)
2	54	Cassius Stanley	SG	United States	Indiana Pacers	Duke (Fr.)
2	55	Jay Scrubb	SG	United States	Brooklyn Nets (from Denver, (Note: July 13, 2018: Denver Nuggets to Brooklyn Nets: Brooklyn acquired Kenneth Faried, Darrell Arthur, a top-12 protected 2019 first-round pick, and a 2020 second-round pick; Denver acquired Isaiah Whitehead) traded to L.A. Clippers)	John A. Logan (So.)
2	56	Grant Riller	SG	United States	Charlotte Hornets (from Boston)	College of Charleston (Sr.)
2	57	Reggie Perry	PF	United States	Los Angeles Clippers (traded to Brooklyn)	Mississippi State (So.)
2	58	Paul Reed	PF	United States	Philadelphia 76ers (from L.A. Lakers via Orlando) (Note: June 20, 2019: Los Angeles Lakers to Orlando Magic: Orlando acquired a 2020 second-round pick and cash considerations; L.A. Lakers acquired the draft rights to Talen Horton-Tucker; February 6, 2020: Orlando Magic to Philadelphia 76ers: Philadelphia acquired the L.A. Lakers' 2020 second-round pick; Orlando acquired James Ennis III)	DePaul (Jr.)
2	59	Jalen Harris	SG	United States	Toronto Raptors	Nevada (Jr.)
2	60	Sam Merrill	SG	United States	New Orleans Pelicans (from Milwaukee, traded to Milwaukee)	Utah State (Sr.)

== Notable undrafted players ==
These players were not selected in the 2020 NBA draft, but have played at least one regular season or postseason game in the NBA.

Player	Pos.	Nationality	School/club team
Ty-Shon Alexander	SG	United States	Creighton (Jr.)
Jarron Cumberland	SG	United States	Cincinnati (Sr.)
Nate Darling	SG	Canada	Delaware (Sr.)
Javin DeLaurier	C	United States	Duke (Sr.)
Mamadi Diakite	PF	Guinea	Virginia (Sr.)
Alpha Diallo	SG	United States	Providence (Sr.)
Devon Dotson	PG	United States	Kansas (So.)
Jeff Dowtin Jr.	PG	United States	Rhode Island (Sr.)
Jaime Echenique	C	Colombia	Wichita State (Sr.)
Rob Edwards	SG	United States	Arizona State (Sr.)
Malik Fitts	PF	United States	Saint Mary's (Jr.)
Jordan Ford	PG	United States	Saint Mary's (Sr.)
Trent Forrest	PG/SG	United States	Florida State (Sr.)
Freddie Gillespie	PF	United States	Baylor (Sr.)
Ashton Hagans	PG	United States	Kentucky (So.)
Josh Hall	SF	United States	Moravian Prep (NC) (H.S. Postgraduate)
Kevon Harris	SG/SF	United States	Stephen F. Austin (Sr.)
Nate Hinton	SG	United States	Houston (So.)
Markus Howard	PG	United States	Marquette (Sr.)
Mason Jones	SG	United States	Arkansas (Jr.)
Kylor Kelley	PF/C	United States	Oregon State (Sr.)
Braxton Key	SF/SG	United States	Virginia (Sr.)
Nathan Knight	PF/C	United States	William & Mary (Sr.)
Anthony Lamb	SF	United States	Vermont (Sr.)
Karim Mané	PG	Canada (Note: Mané was born in Senegal and moved to Canada as a child. He holds dual citizenship and plays for the Canada national basketball team.)	Vanier College (HS Sr.)
Naji Marshall	SF	United States	Xavier (Jr.)
Sean McDermott	SF	United States	Butler (Sr.)
Cameron McGriff	SF	United States	Oklahoma State (Sr.)
Ade Murkey	SG	United States	Denver (Sr.)
Myles Powell	SG	United States	Seton Hall (Sr.)
Trevelin Queen	SG	United States	New Mexico State (Sr.)
Jackson Rowe	SF	Canada	Cal State Fullerton (Sr.)
Matt Ryan	SF	United States	Chattanooga (Sr.)
Trevon Scott	SG	United States	Cincinnati (Sr.)
Zavier Simpson	PG	United States	Michigan (Sr.)
Dmytro Skapintsev	C	Ukraine	Cherkaski Mavpy (Ukraine)
Xavier Sneed	SF	United States	Kansas State (Sr.)
Pat Spencer	PG/SG	United States	Northwestern (Sr.)
Lamar Stevens	PF	United States	Penn State (Sr.)
Jon Teske	C	United States	Michigan (Sr.)
Brodric Thomas	SG	United States	Truman (Sr.)
Killian Tillie	PF/C	France	Gonzaga (Sr.)
Lindy Waters III	SG	United States	Oklahoma State (Sr.)
Jack White	SF	Australia	Duke (Sr.)
Ömer Yurtseven	C	Turkey (Note: Yurtseven was born in Uzbekistan to Turkish parents and raised in Turkey. He plays for the Turkey national basketball team.)	Georgetown (Jr.)

== Trades involving draft picks ==
=== Pre-draft trades ===
Before the day of the draft, the following trades were made and resulted in exchanges of draft picks between the teams.

=== Draft-day trades ===
Draft-day trades will be made on the day of the draft.

== Combine ==
Due to the ongoing COVID-19 pandemic that started earlier in the year, the invitation-only NBA Draft Combine and the event's on-court elements were held in multiple phases, lasting from September 28 until November 16, two days before the draft began. For the first part, players began their league and team interviews via videoconference feeds, similar to this year's draft lottery. This segment lasted from September 28 until October 16. Then, in the second part, players began their individual, on-court programs at the NBA team facility nearest the player's home or interim residence instead of at one standardized area. While players were allowed to continue working out on their own even back in September 2020, this section lasted from October 16 until November 16. This program included strength and agility tests, anthropometric measurements, shooting drills, medical testing and examinations, and a "Pro Day" video filmed via HomeCourt, a mobile basketball training application. The NBA also expanded its Combine HQ tool for this period. While the NBA disallowed their staff members to be involved with these workouts in person (either in the team's practice facilities or near the player himself) at first, they eventually relaxed some of these restrictions to include up to three team executives meeting with a player they're interested in personally, as well as allowed a player to workout with multiple teams at the same time in their towns. The NBA also gave a limit of 10 meetings total with the candidates there, with any extra meetings with someone cutting into their amount allowed for this year.

At the start of this year's draft combine, only 60 prospects were confirmed to participate in this event. The top, headlining prospect involved with this combine is LaMelo Ball, an automatically eligible draft prospect that gained fame as a professional player both nationally and overseas years earlier after skipping his junior year of high school and was a top-3 selection for the draft. In addition to him, R. J. Hampton was also invited as an automatically eligible draft prospect for this year, both representing Australia's NBL as outsider Rising Stars for different teams. Other notable invites include five fully international prospects (Deni Avdija, Killian Hayes, Théo Maledon, Paul Eboua, and Karim Mané, the last of whom played in a Canadian CEGEP), two high school postgraduates (Kenyon Martin Jr. and Josh Hall), and Jay Scrubb, a junior college prospect. Like with prior years, players still held the option to either sit out the combine or have only limited participation there, such as with LaMelo Ball doing interviews with teams only. For the first half of the combine, each participant was given a standard set of 10 questions to answer in front of each team asking them, as well as league officials under a half-hour set, with players being allowed to interview as many teams as possible. In the second half of the combine, teams were allowed to meet with any candidate that had mutual interest in them back, though each team had a set limit of meetings with players in mind before the draft began. These meetings with players allowed teams to properly gauge each player to the best of their abilities during this time.

== Draft lottery ==
External videos
- 2020 NBA Draft Lottery Drawing, NBA's official YouTube channel. August 20, 2020.

The NBA draft lottery is held annually to determine the draft order for the teams that did not make the playoffs in the preceding season. Every NBA team that missed the NBA playoffs holds a chance at winning a top-four pick, but teams with worse records have a better chance at winning a top-four pick, effective as of the 2019 draft. After the lottery selects the teams that receive a top-four pick, the other teams receive an NBA draft pick based on their winning percentage from the prior season. As it is commonplace in the event of identical win-loss records, the NBA performs a random drawing to break ties for not just lottery teams, but also for playoff teams with equal records. This year, the Sacramento Kings won a tiebreaker for the draft lottery over the New Orleans Pelicans despite having a better overall record to conclude the regular season, bubble games included.

The lottery was originally scheduled to take place on May 19 at the United Center in Chicago, Illinois, but was postponed due to the COVID-19 pandemic and the length of the 2019–20 season's suspension. On July 21, 2020, the lottery was rescheduled for August 20. The lottery teams included the eight teams that did not play in the resumed 2019–20 NBA season in July and August: the Golden State Warriors, Cleveland Cavaliers, Minnesota Timberwolves, Atlanta Hawks, Detroit Pistons, New York Knicks, Chicago Bulls, and Charlotte Hornets. They also included the other six teams that missed the playoffs in the resumed season: the Washington Wizards, Phoenix Suns, San Antonio Spurs, Sacramento Kings, New Orleans Pelicans, and Memphis Grizzlies, with seeding completely based on the teams' records from March 12, 2020. The new lottery still took place in the United Center, but all guests representing the teams in the lottery attended virtually instead through video communication feeds. This year, two of the bottom three teams (Minnesota and Golden State) received the top two selections, while Charlotte and Chicago both jumped up into the top four. Teams that resumed their seasons remained at their initial positions set at the time, with Memphis moving down to the 14th selection after initially being set for a playoff spot.

Denotes the actual lottery result

Team	2019–20 record	Lottery chances	Lottery probabilities													
Team	2019–20 record	Lottery chances	1st	2nd	3rd	4th	5th	6th	7th	8th	9th	10th	11th	12th	13th	14th
Golden State Warriors	15–50	140	0.140	0.134	0.127	0.120	0.479	—	—	—	—	—	—	—	—	—
Cleveland Cavaliers	19–46	140	0.140	0.134	0.127	0.120	0.278	0.200	—	—	—	—	—	—	—	—
Minnesota Timberwolves	19–45	140	0.140	0.134	0.127	0.120	0.148	0.260	0.070	—	—	—	—	—	—	—
Atlanta Hawks	20–47	125	0.125	0.122	0.119	0.115	0.072	0.257	0.167	0.022	—	—	—	—	—	—
Detroit Pistons	20–46	105	0.105	0.105	0.106	0.105	0.022	0.196	0.267	0.087	0.006	—	—	—	—	—
New York Knicks	21–45	90	0.090	0.092	0.094	0.096	—	0.086	0.298	0.206	0.037	0.001	—	—	—	—
Chicago Bulls	22–43	75	0.075	0.078	0.081	0.085	—	—	0.197	0.341	0.129	0.013	0.000	—	—	—
Charlotte Hornets	23–42	60	0.060	0.063	0.067	0.072	—	—	—	0.345	0.321	0.068	0.004	0.000	—	—
Washington Wizards	24–40 (25–47)	45	0.045	0.048	0.052	0.057	—	—	—	—	0.507	0.259	0.030	0.001	0.000	—
Phoenix Suns	26–39 (34–39)	30	0.030	0.033	0.036	0.040	—	—	—	—	—	0.659	0.190	0.012	0.000	0.000
San Antonio Spurs	27–36 (32–39)	20	0.020	0.022	0.025	0.028	—	—	—	—	—	—	0.776	0.126	0.004	0.000
Sacramento Kings	28–36 (31–41)	13	0.013	0.014	0.016	0.018	—	—	—	—	—	—	—	0.861	0.076	0.001
New Orleans Pelicans	28–36 (30–42)	12	0.012	0.013	0.015	0.017	—	—	—	—	—	—	—	—	0.920	0.023
Memphis Grizzlies	32–33 (34–39)	5	0.005	0.006	0.006	0.007	—	—	—	—	—	—	—	—	—	0.976

1: The first record was the team's record as of March 12, 2020. The second record includes the team's eight bubble games, which were not used in determining lottery placements.
2: The Memphis Grizzlies' pick was conveyed to the Boston Celtics since their selection stayed at pick 14, outside of the top 4.

== Eligibility and entrants ==
The draft is conducted under the eligibility rules established in the league's 2017 collective bargaining agreement (CBA) with its players' union. The previous CBA that ended the 2011 lockout instituted no immediate changes to the draft but called for a committee of owners and players to discuss future changes.

- All drafted players must be at least 19 years old during the calendar year of the draft. In terms of dates, players who are eligible for the 2020 draft must be born on or before December 31, 2001.
- Since the 2016 draft, the following rules, as implemented by the NCAA Division I council for that division, are:
  - Declaration for the draft no longer results in automatic loss of college eligibility. As long as a player does not sign a contract with a professional team outside the NBA, or sign with an agent, he retains college eligibility as long as he makes a timely withdrawal from the draft.
  - NCAA players now have until 10 days after the end of the NBA Draft Combine to withdraw from the draft. Since the combine is held in mid-May, the current deadline is about five weeks after the previous mid-April deadline.
  - NCAA players may participate in the draft combine and are allowed to attend one tryout per year with each NBA team without losing college eligibility.
  - NCAA players may now enter and withdraw from the draft up to two times without loss of eligibility. Previously, the NCAA treated a second declaration of draft eligibility as a permanent loss of college eligibility.

The NBA has since expanded the draft combine to include players with remaining college eligibility (who, like players without college eligibility, can only attend by invitation).

=== Early entrants ===
Players who are not automatically eligible have to declare their eligibility for the draft by notifying the NBA offices in writing no later than at least 60 days before the event. For the 2020 draft, the date fell on April 26 at first, but the deadline was postponed indefinitely and moved to August 17. After that date, "early entry" players arcanttend NBA pre-draft camps and individual team workouts to show off their skills and obtain feedback regarding their draft positions. Under the CBA a player may withdraw his name from consideration from the draft at any time before the final declaration date, which is 10 days before. Under current NCAA rules, players have until 10 days after the draft combine to withdraw from the draft and retain college eligibility; however, due to COVID-19 disruptions, the NCAA announced that for the 2020 draft, the withdrawal deadline would be changed to 10 days after the combine or August 3, whichever came first.

A player who has hired an agent retains his remaining college eligibility regardless of whether he is drafted after an evaluation from the NBA Undergraduate Advisory Committee. Underclassmen who declare for the NBA draft and are not selected have the opportunity to return to their school for at least another year only after terminating all agreements with their agents, who must have been certified no later than August 1, 2020.

==== College underclassmen ====
This year, 205 underclassed draft prospects (i.e., players with remaining college eligibility) had declared by the initial April 26 deadline, with 163 of these players being from college or were high school postgraduates. The names left over mean they have hired an agent, or have announced that they plan to do so before the night of the draft. At the end of either the August 3 deadline (or the other one which was 10 days post-combine), 71 players declared their intentions to enter the draft with an agent, while 92 announced their return to college for at least one more season (or enter college in the case of Makur Maker). Additionally, one more academy postgraduate student managed to enter at the new underclassman deadline. Furthermore, three different underclassmen that were confirmed at the time (Jermaine Bishop, Isiaha Mike, and Filip Petrušev) all signed overseas contracts in Europe while waiting for this year's draft to begin, though they still remained listed under their colleges they played for before beginning the draft process as opposed to the new teams and leagues they signed for; Petrušev later withdrew from the draft on November 8, 2020 to stay with his new team, the Mega Soccerbet in Serbia, initially leaving the final number of underclassmen students entering the draft at 71 (69 excluding Bishop and Mike). At the November 8 deadline, Tony Goodwin II also withdrew his name from the draft, though Nikolaos Okekuoyen (a Greek-Nigerian postgraduate student from Ridgeview Prep) was approved for the draft that day, which still left the number of players at 71 by that time.

- (Nigeria) Precious Achiuwa – F, Memphis (freshman)
- (United States) Milan Acquaah – G, California Baptist (junior)
- (United States) Ty-Shon Alexander – G, Creighton (junior)
- (United States) Cole Anthony – G, UNC (freshman)
- (United States) Brendan Bailey – F, Marquette (sophomore)
- (United States) Saddiq Bey – F, Villanova (sophomore)
- (United States) Tyler Bey – G, Colorado (junior)
- (United States) Jermaine Bishop – G, Norfolk State (junior)
- (United States) Dachon Burke Jr. – G, Nebraska (junior)
- (United States) Vernon Carey Jr. – F, Duke (freshman)
- (Canada) Nate Darling – G, Delaware (junior)
- (Senegal) Lamine Diane – F, Cal State Northridge (sophomore)
- (United States) Devon Dotson – G, Kansas (sophomore)
- (United States) Anthony Edwards – G, Georgia (freshman)
- (United States) C. J. Elleby – F, Washington State (sophomore)
- (United States) Malik Fitts – F, Saint Mary's (junior)
- (United States) Malachi Flynn – G, San Diego State (junior)
- (Australia) Josh Green – G, Arizona (freshman)
- (United States) Ashton Hagans – G, Kentucky (sophomore)
- (United States) Tyrese Haliburton – G, Iowa State (sophomore)
- (United States) Josh Hall – F, Moravian Prep (Hudson, NC; postgraduate)
- (United States) Rayshaun Hammonds – F, Georgia (junior)
- (United States) Jalen Harris – G, Nevada (junior)
- (United States) Niven Hart – G, Fresno State (freshman)
- (United States) Nate Hinton – G, Houston (sophomore)
- (United States) Elijah Hughes – F, Syracuse (junior)
- (United States) Isaiah Joe – G, Arkansas (sophomore)
- (United States) Dakari Johnson – G, Cape Fear CC (freshman)
- (United States) C. J. Jones – G, Middle Tennessee (junior)
- (United States) Mason Jones – G, Arkansas (junior)
- (United States) Tre Jones – G, Duke (sophomore)
- (United States) Saben Lee – G, Vanderbilt (junior)
- (United States) Micheal Lenoir – G, Creating Young Minds Academy (Irving, TX; postgraduate)
- (United States) Kira Lewis – G, Alabama (sophomore)
- (Italy) / (United States) Nico Mannion – G, Arizona (freshman)
- (United States) Naji Marshall – F, Xavier (junior)
- (United States) Kenyon Martin Jr. – G, IMG Academy (Bradenton, FL; postgraduate)
- (United States) Tyrese Maxey – G, Kentucky (freshman)
- (United States) Jaden McDaniels – F, Washington (freshman)
- (Canada) Isiaha Mike – F, SMU (junior)
- (United States) E. J. Montgomery – F, Kentucky (sophomore)
- (United States) Aaron Nesmith – G, Vanderbilt (sophomore)
- (United States) Zeke Nnaji – F, Arizona (freshman)
- (United States) / (Nigeria) Jordan Nwora – F, Louisville (junior)
- (Greece) / (Nigeria) Nikolaos Okekuoyen – C, Ridgeview Prep (Hickory, NC; postgraduate)
- (United States) Onyeka Okongwu – F, USC (freshman)
- (United States) Isaac Okoro – F, Auburn (freshman)
- (United States) Daniel Oturu – C, Minnesota (sophomore)
- (United States) Reggie Perry – F, Mississippi State (sophomore)
- (United States) Nate Pierre-Louis – G, Temple (junior)
- (United States) Immanuel Quickley – G, Kentucky (sophomore)
- (United States) Jahmi'us Ramsey – G, Texas Tech (freshman)
- (United States) Paul Reed – F, DePaul (junior)
- (Jamaica) Nick Richards – C, Kentucky (junior)
- (United States) Jay Scrubb – G, John A. Logan College (sophomore)
- (United States) Jalen Smith – F, Maryland (sophomore)
- (United States) Cassius Stanley – G, Duke (freshman)
- (United States) Isaiah Stewart – F, Washington (freshman)
- (United States) Tyrell Terry – G, Stanford (freshman)
- (United States) Xavier Tillman – C, Michigan State (junior)
- (United States) Obi Toppin – F, Dayton (sophomore)
- (United States) Jordan Tucker – F, Butler (junior)
- (United States) Devin Vassell – G, Florida State (sophomore)
- (United States) Nick Weatherspoon – G, Mississippi State (junior)
- (United States) Kaleb Wesson – F, Ohio State (junior)
- (United States) Kahlil Whitney – F, Kentucky (freshman)
- (United States) Emmitt Williams – F, LSU (sophomore)
- (United States) Patrick Williams – F, Florida State (freshman)
- (United States) James Wiseman – C, Memphis (freshman)
- (United States) Robert Woodard II – F, Mississippi State (sophomore)
- (Turkey) Ömer Yurtseven – C, Georgetown (junior)

==== International players ====
International players who were declared this year and did not previously declare in another prior year can drop out about 10 days before the 2020 draft, which was November 8 this year. By the initial April 26 deadline, 42 international prospects, including one from a Canadian CEGEP (Quebecer college), expressed interest in this draft. By the end of the deadline set in August, seven of these players pulled their names out, leaving only 35 prospects, later adding one more player from a Canadian preparatory academy who also entered at that deadline. With Sergi Martínez & Joel Parra also dropping out of the draft before the draft deadline concluded, but after the official announcement came out, this officially brought the final number of underclassmen available down to 84 players instead of 86, with 23 international players exiting the draft by November this year instead of 21.

- / (Serbia) Deni Avdija – F, Maccabi Tel Aviv (Israel)
- Adrian Bogucki – C, Anwil Włocławek (Poland)
- (Argentina) / (Italy) Leandro Bolmaro – G, FC Barcelona (Spain)
- (Trinidad and Tobago) Imru Duke – F, CB Peñas Huesca (Spain)
- (Cameroon) / Paul Eboua – F, Stella Azzurra Roma (Italy)
- (France) Killian Hayes – G, ratiopharm Ulm (Germany)
- (Czech Republic) Vít Krejčí – G, Casademont Zaragoza (Spain)
- Yam Madar – G, Hapoel Tel Aviv (Israel)
- Théo Maledon – G, ASVEL (France)
- Karim Mané – G, Vanier College (QC, Canada)
- (Serbia) Aleksej Pokuševski – F, Olympiacos Pireaus (Greece)
- (Montenegro) Marko Simonović – C, Mega Soccerbet (Serbia)
- Mouhamed Thiam – C, Nanterre 92 (France)

=== Automatically eligible entrants ===
Players who do not meet the criteria for "international" players are automatically eligible if they meet any of the following criteria:

- They have completed four years of their college eligibility.
- If they graduated from high school in the U.S., but did not enroll in a U.S. college or university, four years have passed since their high school class graduated.
- They have signed a contract with a professional basketball team not in the NBA, but anywhere in the world, and have played under that contract.

Players who meet the criteria for "international" players are automatically eligible if they meet any of the following criteria:

- They are at least 22 years old during the calendar year of the draft. In terms of dates, players born on or before December 31, 1998, are automatically eligible for the 2020 draft.
- They have signed a contract with a professional basketball team not in the NBA within the United States, and have played under that contract.

Other automatically eligible players
Player	Team	Note	Ref.
(United States) Terry Armstrong	South East Melbourne Phoenix (Australia)	Did not attend college; began playing professionally since the 2019–20 season	
(United States) LaMelo Ball	Illawarra Hawks (Australia)	Did not attend college; began playing professionally since the 2017–18 season	
(Australia) Sam Froling	Illawarra Hawks (Australia)	Left Creighton in 2019; began playing professionally since the 2019–20 season	
(United States) R. J. Hampton	New Zealand Breakers (New Zealand)	Did not attend college; began playing professionally since the 2019–20 season	
(United States) / (United Kingdom) Sacha Killeya-Jones	MKS Dąbrowa Górnicza (Poland)	Left Kentucky in 2018; began playing professionally since the 2018–19 season Played for the BC Kalev/Cramo in Estonia during 2019–20 before signing with a new team in July 2020	
(Australia) Alex Mudronja	Adelaide 36ers (Australia)	Left Saint Mary's in 2019; began playing professionally since the 2019–20 season	
(South Sudan) / (Australia) Kouat Noi	Cairns Taipans (Australia)	Left TCU in 2019; began playing professionally since the 2019–20 season	
(Japan) Kai Toews	Utsunomiya Brex (Japan)	Left UNC Wilmington in 2019; began playing professionally since the 2019–20 season	

== Virtual invited attendees ==
The 2020 NBA draft is considered to be the 42nd NBA draft to have utilized what is properly considered the "green room" experience for NBA prospects. Normally, the NBA's green room is a staging area where anticipated draftees often sit with their families and representatives, waiting for their names to be called on draft night. In those typical years, while often being positioned either in front of or to the side of the podium (in this case, being positioned somewhere within the Barclays Center), once a player heard his name, he would walk to the podium to shake hands and take promotional photos with the NBA commissioner. From there, the players often conducted interviews with various media outlets while backstage. From there, the players often conducted interviews with various media outlets while backstage. However, once the NBA draft started to air nationally on TV starting with the 1980 NBA draft, the green room initially evolved from players waiting to hear their name called and then shaking hands with these select players who were often called to the hotel to take promotional pictures with the NBA commissioner a day or two after the draft concluded to having players in real-time waiting to hear their names called up and then shaking hands with Adam Silver, the NBA's current commissioner. However, due to the COVID-19 pandemic cancelling the original NBA draft plans for this year and then rescheduling it into the month of November (which normally would be around the time when the NBA's season would begin properly), the NBA and ESPN would have to improvise a way to emulate the typical "green room" experience with the necessary restrictions of the time.

For the changes implemented this season, the NBA would partner up with the New Era Cap Company to provide the intended invited attendees of this draft with an in-home gift locker filled with the hat of all 30 NBA teams from this draft. Upon learning which team had drafted them once their name had been mentioned by the commissioner, the player would then have the appropriate hat on hand, followed by the broadcast from ESPN broadcasting their selections directly from their homes. As for the actual invited attendees for this specific draft, the NBA still compiled its list of green room invites through collective voting by the NBA's team presidents and general managers alike, which in this year's case belonged to only what they believed were the top 27 prospects at the time (though the actual group photo showed 28 prospects at hand). Despite nearly having enough prospects to fill up the first round properly, some of the invited prospects from the NBA's end (namely Tyrell Terry, Vernon Carey Jr., Théo Maledon, Jahmi'us Ramsey, and Nico Mannion) would still end up being selected within the second round instead. Even so, the following players were invited to attend this year's draft festivities live and in person.

- (Nigeria) Precious Achiuwa – PF, Memphis
- (United States) Cole Anthony – PG, North Carolina
- Deni Avdija – SF, Maccabi FOX Tel Aviv (Israel)
- (United States) LaMelo Ball – PG, Illawarra Hawks (Australia)
- (United States) Saddiq Bey – SF, Villanova
- (United States) Vernon Carey Jr. – PF, Duke
- (United States) Anthony Edwards – SG, Georgia
- (Australia) Josh Green – SG, Arizona
- (United States) Tyrese Haliburton – PG, Iowa State
- (United States) R. J. Hampton – SG, New Zealand Breakers (Australia/New Zealand)
- (United States) / (France) Killian Hayes – PG, Ratiopharm Ulm (Germany)
- Théo Maledon – PG, ASVEL Villeurbanne (France)
- (Italy) Nico Mannion – PG, Arizona
- (United States) Tyrese Maxey – PG, Kentucky
- (United States) Jaden McDaniels – SF, Washington
- (United States) Aaron Nesmith – SF, Vanderbilt
- (United States) Zeke Nnaji – PF/C, Arizona
- (United States) Onyeka Okongwu – PF, USC
- (United States) Isaac Okoro – SF, Auburn
- (Serbia) Aleksej Pokuševski – SF/PF, Olympiacos Piraeus B (Greece)
- (United States) Jahmi'us Ramsey – SG, Texas Tech
- (United States) Jalen Smith – PF/C, Maryland
- (United States) Isaiah Stewart – PF/C, Washington
- (United States) Tyrell Terry – PG, Stanford
- (United States) Obi Toppin – PF, Dayton
- (United States) Patrick Williams – SF, Florida State
- (United States) James Wiseman – C, Memphis

== See also ==
- List of first overall NBA draft picks
