= Brandon Brown (basketball, born 1991) =

American basketball player

Free agent
- Position: Point guard

Personal information
- Born: September 18, 1991 (age 35) Phoenix, Arizona, U.S.
- Listed height: 6 ft 0 in (1.83 m)
- Listed weight: 160 lb (73 kg)

Career information
- High school: Cesar Chavez (Phoenix, Arizona)
- College: Phoenix College (2013–2015); Loyola Marymount (2015–2017)
- NBA draft: 2017: undrafted
- Playing career: 2017–present

Career history
- 2017–2018: Boncourt
- 2018: Panionios
- 2018–2019: Poitiers 86
- 2019: Union Neuchâtel
- 2019–2022: Rilski Sportist
- 2022–2023: Labas Gas Prienai
- 2023: Juventus Utena
- 2023: Nalaikh Bison

Career highlights
- 2x Bulgarian Cup winner (2021, 2022); 2x Bulgarian Super Cup winner (2021, 2022); Swiss League Top Scorrer (2018); Second-team All-WCC (2017); NABC Junior College Player of the Year (2015)

Brandon Dwayne Brown (born September 18, 1991) is an American professional basketball player. Standing at 1.80 m (5 ft 11 in), he plays at the Point guard position. After playing four years of college basketball at Phoenix College and at Loyola Marymount, Brown entered the 2017 NBA draft, but he was not selected in the draft's two rounds. He was the Swiss League Top Scorer in 2018, averaging 27 points per game.

== High school career ==
Brown played high school basketball at Cesar Chavez High School in Phoenix, Arizona. After high school, he served a two-year prison term.

== College career ==
Brown played his first two years of college basketball at Phoenix College, until 2015. He earned Spalding National JUCO Division II player of the year honor after averaging 20.1 points and 6.1 assists per game. After two years, Brown transferred to Loyola Marymount, where he averaged 13.2 points, 4.9 assists and 2.9 rebounds per game in his last two seasons.

== Professional career ==
After going undrafted in the 2017 NBA draft, Brown joined Boncourt of the Swiss League. He played 30 games with the club and he was the Swiss League Top Scorer of the 2018 season, after averaging 27 points per game. He also added 3.5 rebounds and 3.3 assists per game.

On September 25, 2018, he joined Panionios of the Greek Basket League. On November 27, 2018, he joined Poitiers 86 of the Pro B.

On August 20, 2019, he signed for Rilski Sportist of the NBL. Brown averaged 15.6 points, 5.5 assists and 1.7 steals per game. He re-signed with the team on July 23, 2020.
