= 2022–23 National Basketball League (Bulgaria) season =

NBL
- Games played: 165 (Regular season)
- Teams: 11
- TV partner(s): Max Sport

Regular season
- Top seed: Rilski Sportist
- Season MVP: (United States) Ishmael El-Amin (Shumen)

Finals
- Champions: Balkan Botevgrad
- Runners-up: Chernomorets
- Third place: CSKA Sofia
- Fourth place: Rilski Sportist
- Finals MVP: (Chile) Manny Suárez (Balkan Botevgrad)

Statistical leaders
- Points: (United States) Ishmael El-Amin (Shumen) - 24.2
- Rebounds: (United States) Averyl Ugba (Cherno More) - 10.6
- Assists: (Canada) Munis Tutu (Chernomorets) - 9.1
- Index Rating: (United States) Tamenang Choh (CSKA Sofia) - 27.3

The 2022–23 National Basketball League (Bulgaria) season was the 82nd season of the Bulgarian NBL. The season was contested by eleven teams.

== Teams ==
CSKA Sofia returned to the league as winners of the second division, after a 12 year absence from the NBL.

2022–23 Bulgarian National Basketball League club locations.

Club	Last season	Arena	Location	Capacity
Academic Plovdiv	6th	Kolodruma	Plovdiv	6,100
Balkan Botevgrad	1st	Arena Botevgrad	Botevgrad	4,500
Beroe	7th	Municipal Hall	Stara Zagora	1,000
Cherno More Ticha	10th	Hristo Borisov	Varna	1,000
Chernomorets	5th	Boycho Branzov	Burgas	1,000
CSKA Sofia	1st (second division)	CSKA	Sofia	450
Levski	3rd	Universiada Hall	Sofia	4,000
Rilski Sportist	2nd	Arena Samokov	Samokov	2,500
Shumen	9th	Arena Shumen	Shumen	1,500
Spartak Pleven	4th	Balkanstroy	Pleven	1,200
Yambol	8th	Diana	Yambol	3,000

== Regular season ==
=== League table ===
Pos	Team	Pld	W	L	PF	PA	PD	Pts	Qualification
1	Rilski Sportist	30	26	4	2728	2312	+416	56	Advance to playoffs
2	Balkan Botevgrad	30	23	7	2576	2275	+301	53	Advance to playoffs
3	CSKA Sofia	30	20	10	2506	2381	+125	50	Advance to playoffs
4	Chernomorets	30	19	11	2629	2438	+191	49	Advance to playoffs
5	Spartak Pleven	30	16	14	2522	2431	+91	46	Advance to playoffs
6	Levski	30	15	15	2399	2351	+48	45	Advance to playoffs
7	Beroe	30	14	16	2568	2677	−109	44	Advance to playoffs
8	Academic Plovdiv	30	11	19	2400	2537	−137	41	Advance to playoffs
9	Yambol	30	9	21	2373	2602	−229	39	
10	Shumen	30	6	24	2278	2687	−409	36	
11	Cherno More	30	6	24	2516	2804	−288	36	

Source: NBL

=== Results ===
Home \ Away	ACP	BAL	BER	CMT	CHE	CSS	LEV	RIL	SHU	SPA	YAM	ACP	BAL	BER	CMT	CHE	CSS	LEV	RIL	SHU	SPA	YAM
Academic		70–74	92–72	100–86	87–82	73–100	69–83	78–79	91–66	77–90	79–71		67–74		92–85		99–74		87–83	79–72		
Balkan	89–59		105–71	98–87	83–78	81–67	89–64	68–83	87–68	81–60	98–76			82–83		92–88	71–81	77–68			78–67	
Beroe	94–86	85–86		94–75	79–91	85–81	78–71	92–95	104–79	68–93	82–88	90–84			104–75				100–114	98–103		102–86
Cherno More	105–88	85–88	98–109		84–96	95–98	74–95	77–86	98–86	86–77	107–87		76–105				84–93	73–91	74–108	101–105		
Chernomorets	96–84	93–83	71–78	87–77		100–84	70–81	91–98	94–87	88–81	88–70	94–70		96–69	114–71						90–76	87–77
CSKA Sofia	82–75	78–72	96–68	97–84	80–63		78–52	76–82	79–58	65–91	80–73			104–71		88–86		77–72			101–87	71–75
Levski	88–74	71–83	104–74	80–61	80–70	95–92		73–89	83–70	82–69	89–67	96–88		79–88		94–104					85–86	82–89
Rilski Sportist	95–60	89–83	100–84	85–76	102–69	84–72	89–73		103–71	87–68	104–67		77–76			72–87	86–89	81–70			88–84	
Shumen	72–78	63–88	77–74	82–78	79–94	68–70	67–78	63–92		86–79	68–84		89–105			70–85	77–102	62–86	71–99			
Spartak	81–72	81–88	81–97	82–78	84–77	84–86	77–65	78–104	81–67		84–82	92–69		105–81	102–87					104–81		108–77
Yambol	87–83	55–81	80–94	88–90	78–100	90–65	86–69	86–80	91–76	58–90		85–90	84–89		87–89				69–94	80–83		

Source: NBL
Legend: Blue = home team win; Red = away team win.

== Playoffs ==
=== Bracket ===
Quarterfinals
1	Rilski Sportist	76	85	97
8	Academic Plovdiv	79	66	67
4	Chernomorets	89	75
5	Spartak Pleven	70	69
2	Balkan Botevgrad	89	91
7	Beroe	78	72
3	CSKA Sofia	94	87
6	Levski	77	79

Semifinals
1	Rilski Sportist	73	82	70	90
4	Chernomorets	79	75	84	95
2	Balkan Botevgrad	79	80	85	92
3	CSKA Sofia	90	71	70	83

Finals
2	Balkan Botevgrad	87	87	83
4	Chernomorets	74	64	75
Third place
1	Rilski Sportist	71	72
3	CSKA Sofia	88	86

== Player of the round ==
Round	Player	Team	PIR
1	(United States) Cornelius Hudson	Beroe	35
2	(Bulgaria) Vasil Bachev	Academic	32
3	(United States) Dequan Morris	Yambol	31
4	(United States) Averyl Ugba	Cherno More	29
5	(United States) Barret Benson	Spartak Pleven	30
6	(Bulgaria) Zlatin Georgiev	Levski Sofia	42
7	(The Bahamas) Zane Knowles	CSKA Sofia	37
8	(Chile) Manny Suárez	Balkan	26
9	(Cape Verde) Williams Tavares	Yambol	28
10	(Chile) Manny Suárez	Balkan	40
11	(United States) Darius Hall	Beroe	41
12	(Canada) Munis Tutu	Chernomorets	38
13	(Bulgaria) Georgi Boyanov	Chernomorets	38
14	(United States) Averyl Ugba	Cherno More	49
15	(Canada) Munis Tutu	Chernomorets	37
16	(Bulgaria) Chavdar Kostov	Rilski Sportist	32
17	(United States) Averyl Ugba	Cherno More	34
18	(United States) John Florveus	Levski Sofia	36
19	(Bulgaria) Georgi Boyanov	Chernomorets	36
20	(United States) Ishmael El-Amin	Shumen	34
21	(United States) Tamenang Choh	CSKA Sofia	46
22	(United States) Kelsey Barlow	Beroe	46
23	(United States) Tamenang Choh	CSKA Sofia	49
24	(Bulgaria) Aleksandar Yanev	Rilski Sportist	39
25	(United States) Ishmael El-Amin	Shumen	43
26	(United States) Ishmael El-Amin	Shumen	53
27	(United States) Jordan Tucker	Chernomorets	49
28	(United States) Thatch Unruch	Cherno More	35
29	(United States) Ishmael El-Amin	Shumen	35
30	(Chile) Manny Suárez	Balkan	35
31	(United States) Alan Arnett	Levski Sofia	37
32	(United States) Ishmael El-Amin	Shumen	39
33	(Bulgaria) Hristo Zahariev	Balkan	30

== Bulgarian clubs in European competitions ==
Team	Competition	Progress
Balkan	FIBA Europe Cup	Regular season
Rilski Sportist	FIBA Europe Cup	Regular season

== NBL clubs in regional competitions ==
Team	Competition	Progress
Levski	Balkan League	First round
Beroe	Balkan League	Third Place
