= BC Shumen =

Shumen
- League: NBL
- Founded: 1950
- History: BC Shumen (1950–1986); Stroitel (1986–1992); Ficosota Shumen (1994–2002); BC Shumen (2002–present)
- Arena: Arena Shumen
- Capacity: 1,494
- Location: Shumen, Bulgaria
- Team colors: Yellow and Green
- Main sponsor: Ficosota
- President: (Bulgaria) Stoyan Popov
- Team manager: (Bulgaria) Pavlin Tzanev
- Head coach: (Bulgaria) Rosen Barchovski
- 2025–26 position: 11th
- Website: shumenbasket.org
Uniform	Uniform

BC Shumen (Bulgarian: БК Шумен) is a Bulgarian professional basketball club based in Shumen.

== History ==
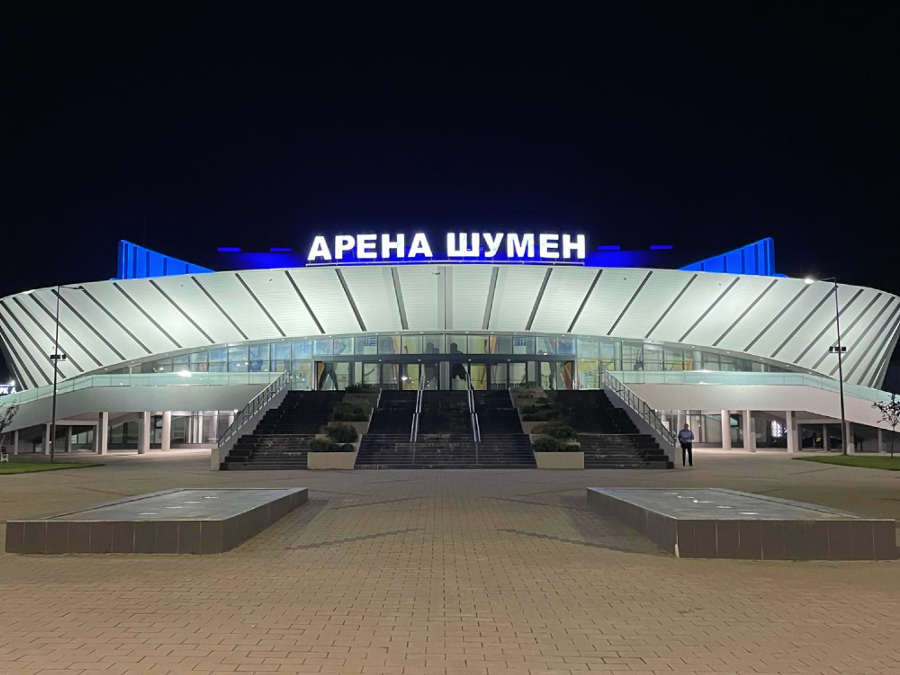
BC Shumen have been playing at the Arena Shumen since 2021

BC Shumen was founded in 1950 and played in the lower divisions of the Bulgarian basketball system for several decades. From 1986 to 2002, the team played in the top basketball league of Bulgaria (NBL). In the span of just four seasons at the end of the 20th century, BC Shumen (then playing as Ficosota Shumen) finished second in the regular season, third in the playoffs on two occasions, and was a finalist in the 1999 Bulgarian Basketball Cup, losing to BC Cherno More. The team also took part in the 1995–96, 1997–98 and 1998–99 seasons of the FIBA Korać Cup, reaching the round of 64 in 1995–96.

BC Shumen returned to the top tier NBL division for the 2021–22 season, ending nearly 20 years of absence. During the 2023–24 season, the team finished 7th and reached the playoffs for the first time since 2002.

== Honours ==
- Bulgarian Championship
  - Bronze medalist (2): 1998, 1999
- Bulgarian Cup
  - Runners-up (1): 1999
- FIBA Korać Cup
  - Round of 64 (1): 1995–96

== Season by season ==
Season	Tier	Division	Pos.	W–L	Postseason	W–L	Bulgarian Cup	European competitions
2017-18	2	BBL "A" Group	5th	8–14	-		DNQ	-
2018-19	2	BBL "A" Group	6th	8–7	4th	4–5	DNQ	-
2019-20	2	BBL "A" Group	Abandoned	17–2	-		DNQ	-
2020-21	2	BBL "A" Group East	2nd	10–4	3rd ↑	3–2	DNQ	-
2021-22	1	NBL	9th	4–23	DNQ		DNQ	-
2022-23	1	NBL	10th	6–24	DNQ		DNQ	-
2023-24	1	NBL	7th	15–17	Quarterfinalist	0–2	DNQ	-
2024-25	1	NBL	9th	2–22	DNQ		DNQ	-
2025-26	1	NBL	11th	3–27	DNQ		DNQ	-
2026-27	1	NBL	TBD	TBD	TBD		TBD	-

=== NBL attendance by season ===
Season	Games	Attendance	Average	Lowest	Highest	Occupancy
2021-22	15	3,490	233	100	600	15.57%
2022-23	15	6,303	420	200	753	28.13%
2023-24	17	7,830	461	180	1,000	30.83%
2024-25	12	5,250	438	200	1,000	29.28%
2025-26 (Note: Due to renovations at the Arena Shumen, 10 of the 15 home games were played at the 700-capacity Mladost Hall.)	15	4,417	294	100	500	30.53%

== BC Shumen in European basketball ==
FIBA Korać Cup

Season	Round	Club	Home	Away	Aggregate
1995–96	First round	(Moldova) Floare	85–61	65–71	150–132
1995–96	Round of 64	(Turkey) PTT	81–91	87–92	168–183
1997–98	Qualifying round	(North Macedonia) Orka Sport	85–85	95-106	180–191
1998–99	Qualifying round	(Slovakia) BK Chemosvit	73-73	61-76	134-149
