= BC Chernomorets =

Bulgarian basketball club

- Nickname: The Sharks
- Leagues: NBL
- Founded: 1946; 80 years ago
- Withdrew: 2024; 2 years ago
- Arena: Arena Burgas
- Capacity: 6,000
- Location: Burgas, Bulgaria
- President: Vasil Stoyanov
- Head coach: Vassil Evtimov
- Championships: 3 Bulgarian Cups, 0 NBL Titles

BC Chernomorets, also known as Chernomorets Burgas, was a Bulgarian professional basketball club based in Burgas. The team played in the NBL, the highest level of national basketball. BC Chernomorets withdrew from the 2024-25 NBL season on September 29, 2024 after failing to register a team due to unpaid wages to players and coaches from the previous season. The team has not returned to an NBL season since. The club has won three Bulgarian Cups, in 1965, 1975 and 2024.

== History ==
Basketball is a sport with a long tradition in Burgas. For 64 years there has been a men's professional basketball team. BC "Chernomorets" - Burgas is the basketball club name in Bulgaria. The team successfully competed four years among the elite in the Bulgarian Basketball Championship. Team members became bronze medalists at the National Championship in 1981 and 1991, and were winners of the Cup of Bulgaria in 1965 and 1975. Burgas has a basketball hall with 1000 seats for spectators. In the strongest seasons of Burgas team it was always filled to capacity. Prominent representatives in coaching were Dinko Hadjidinev and Panayot Vlaev. In the years of the existence of Burgas basketball, many medals and championship titles have been won by our children and adolescents, as the last example of this is winning the bronze medal in the Junior League season 2009/2010. From Burgas beginnings, many names have gone on to professional leagues including Boycho Branzov, Petko Marinov, Atanas Stoyanov, Georgi Yordanov, Kostov Stancho, Dimo Kostov, and Decho Koeshinov.

== Honours ==
- Bulgarian Cup
  - Winners (3): 1965, 1975, 2024
- Bulgarian Championship
  - Second place (1): 2023
    - Third place (2): 1981, 1991
