= Zakharovo =

Zakharovo (Russian: Захарово) is the name of several rural localities in Russia.

== Altai Krai ==
As of 2010, two rural localities in Altai Krai bear this name:

- Zakharovo, Rubtsovsky District, Altai Krai, a selo in Bezrukavsky Selsoviet of Rubtsovsky District
- Zakharovo, Zalesovsky District, Altai Krai, a selo in Dumchevsky Selsoviet of Zalesovsky District

== Arkhangelsk Oblast ==
As of 2010, three rural localities in Arkhangelsk Oblast bear this name:

- Zakharovo, Lisestrovsky Selsoviet, Primorsky District, Arkhangelsk Oblast, a village in Lisestrovsky Selsoviet of Primorsky District
- Zakharovo, Voznesensky Selsoviet, Primorsky District, Arkhangelsk Oblast, a village in Voznesensky Selsoviet of Primorsky District
- Zakharovo, Velsky District, Arkhangelsk Oblast, a village in Poponavolotsky Selsoviet of Velsky District

== Belgorod Oblast ==
As of 2010, one rural locality in Belgorod Oblast bears this name:

- Zakharovo, Belgorod Oblast, a selo in Chernyansky District

== Bryansk Oblast ==
As of 2010, one rural locality in Bryansk Oblast bears this name:

- Zakharovo, Bryansk Oblast, a village in Lopandinsky Selsoviet of Komarichsky District

== Ivanovo Oblast ==
As of 2010, four rural localities in Ivanovo Oblast bear this name:

- Zakharovo (Timiryazevskoye Rural Settlement), Lukhsky District, Ivanovo Oblast, a village in Lukhsky District; municipally, a part of Timiryazevskoye Rural Settlement of that district
- Zakharovo (Ryabovskoye Rural Settlement), Lukhsky District, Ivanovo Oblast, a village in Lukhsky District; municipally, a part of Ryabovskoye Rural Settlement of that district
- Zakharovo, Shuysky District, Ivanovo Oblast, a village in Shuysky District
- Zakharovo, Teykovsky District, Ivanovo Oblast, a village in Teykovsky District

== Kaluga Oblast ==
As of 2010, three rural localities in Kaluga Oblast bear this name:

- Zakharovo, Dzerzhinsky District, Kaluga Oblast, a village in Dzerzhinsky District
- Zakharovo, Iznoskovsky District, Kaluga Oblast, a village in Iznoskovsky District
- Zakharovo, Maloyaroslavetsky District, Kaluga Oblast, a village in Maloyaroslavetsky District

== Kirov Oblast ==
As of 2010, one rural locality in Kirov Oblast bears this name:

- Zakharovo, Kirov Oblast, a village in Kaysky Rural Okrug of Verkhnekamsky District

== Komi Republic ==
As of 2010, one rural locality in the Komi Republic bears this name:

- Zakharovo, Komi Republic, a village in Yb Selo Administrative Territory of Syktyvdinsky District

== Kostroma Oblast ==
As of 2010, six rural localities in Kostroma Oblast bear this name:

- Zakharovo, Buysky District, Kostroma Oblast, a village in Tsentralnoye Settlement of Buysky District
- Zakharovo, Chukhlomsky District, Kostroma Oblast, a village in Chukhlomskoye Settlement of Chukhlomsky District
- Zakharovo, Baksheyevskoye Settlement, Kostromskoy District, Kostroma Oblast, a village in Baksheyevskoye Settlement of Kostromskoy District
- Zakharovo, Shungenskoye Settlement, Kostromskoy District, Kostroma Oblast, a village in Shungenskoye Settlement of Kostromskoy District
- Zakharovo, Krasnoselsky District, Kostroma Oblast, a village in Zakharovskoye Settlement of Krasnoselsky District
- Zakharovo, Nerekhtsky District, Kostroma Oblast, a village in Yemsnenskoye Settlement of Nerekhtsky District

== Kursk Oblast ==
As of 2010, one rural locality in Kursk Oblast bears this name:

- Zakharovo, Kursk Oblast, a village in Buninsky Selsoviet of Solntsevsky District

== Mari El Republic ==
As of 2010, one rural locality in the Mari El Republic bears this name:

- Zakharovo, Mari El Republic, a village in Chendemerovsky Rural Okrug of Sernursky District

== Moscow Oblast ==
As of 2010, eight rural localities in Moscow Oblast bear this name:

- Zakharovo, Istrinsky District, Moscow Oblast, a village in Obushkovskoye Rural Settlement of Istrinsky District
- Zakharovo, Petrovskoye Rural Settlement, Klinsky District, Moscow Oblast, a village in Petrovskoye Rural Settlement of Klinsky District
- Zakharovo, Klin Town, Klinsky District, Moscow Oblast, a village under the administrative jurisdiction of the Town of Klin in Klinsky District
- Zakharovo, Odintsovsky District, Moscow Oblast, a village in Zakharovskoye Rural Settlement of Odintsovsky District
- Zakharovo, Rybolovskoye Rural Settlement, Ramensky District, Moscow Oblast, a village in Rybolovskoye Rural Settlement of Ramensky District
- Zakharovo, Kratovo Suburban Settlement, Ramensky District, Moscow Oblast, a village under the administrative jurisdiction of the suburban settlement of Kratovo in Ramensky District
- Zakharovo, Stupinsky District, Moscow Oblast, a village in Leontyevskoye Rural Settlement of Stupinsky District
- Zakharovo, Yegoryevsky District, Moscow Oblast, a village under the administrative jurisdiction of the Town of Yegoryevsk in Yegoryevsky District

== Nizhny Novgorod Oblast ==
As of 2010, six rural localities in Nizhny Novgorod Oblast bear this name:

- Zakharovo, Bor, Nizhny Novgorod Oblast, a village in Lindovsky Selsoviet of the town of oblast significance of Bor
- Zakharovo, Semyonov, Nizhny Novgorod Oblast, a village in Shaldezhsky Selsoviet of the town of oblast significance of Semyonov
- Zakharovo, Pavlovsky District, Nizhny Novgorod Oblast, a village in Ababkovsky Selsoviet of Pavlovsky District
- Zakharovo, Sokolsky District, Nizhny Novgorod Oblast, a village in Volzhsky Selsoviet of Sokolsky District
- Zakharovo, Sosnovsky District, Nizhny Novgorod Oblast, a village in Yakovsky Selsoviet of Sosnovsky District
- Zakharovo, Tonkinsky District, Nizhny Novgorod Oblast, a village in Bolshesodomovsky Selsoviet of Tonkinsky District

== Novgorod Oblast ==
As of 2010, one rural locality in Novgorod Oblast bears this name:

- Zakharovo, Novgorod Oblast, a village in Burginskoye Settlement of Malovishersky District

== Perm Krai ==
As of 2010, one rural locality in Perm Krai bears this name:

- Zakharovo, Perm Krai, a village under the administrative jurisdiction of the town of krai significance of Lysva

== Pskov Oblast ==
As of 2010, two rural localities in Pskov Oblast bear this name:

- Zakharovo, Novosokolnichesky District, Pskov Oblast, a village in Novosokolnichesky District
- Zakharovo, Velikoluksky District, Pskov Oblast, a village in Velikoluksky District

== Ryazan Oblast ==
As of 2010, three rural localities in Ryazan Oblast bear this name:

- Zakharovo, Kasimovsky District, Ryazan Oblast, a village in Tokarevsky Rural Okrug of Kasimovsky District
- Zakharovo, Klepikovsky District, Ryazan Oblast, a village in Oskinsky Rural Okrug of Klepikovsky District
- Zakharovo, Zakharovsky District, Ryazan Oblast, a selo in Zakharovsky Rural Okrug of Zakharovsky District

== Tver Oblast ==
As of 2010, ten rural localities in Tver Oblast bear this name:

- Zakharovo, Bezhetsky District, Tver Oblast, a village in Fralevskoye Rural Settlement of Bezhetsky District
- Zakharovo, Kalininsky District, Tver Oblast, a village in Verkhnevolzhskoye Rural Settlement of Kalininsky District
- Zakharovo, Kashinsky District, Tver Oblast, a village in Unitskoye Rural Settlement of Kashinsky District
- Zakharovo, Konakovsky District, Tver Oblast, a village in Ruchyevskoye Rural Settlement of Konakovsky District
- Zakharovo, Likhoslavlsky District, Tver Oblast, a village in Kavskoye Rural Settlement of Likhoslavlsky District
- Zakharovo, Uspenskoye Rural Settlement, Rzhevsky District, Tver Oblast, a village in Uspenskoye Rural Settlement of Rzhevsky District
- Zakharovo, Yesinka Rural Settlement, Rzhevsky District, Tver Oblast, a village in Yesinka Rural Settlement of Rzhevsky District
- Zakharovo, Selizharovsky District, Tver Oblast, a village in Zakharovskoye Rural Settlement of Selizharovsky District
- Zakharovo, Spirovsky District, Tver Oblast, a village in Kozlovskoye Rural Settlement of Spirovsky District
- Zakharovo, Udomelsky District, Tver Oblast, a village in Mstinskoye Rural Settlement of Udomelsky District

== Udmurt Republic ==
As of 2010, one rural locality in the Udmurt Republic bears this name:

- Zakharovo, Udmurt Republic, a village in Iyulsky Selsoviet of Votkinsky District

== Vladimir Oblast ==
As of 2010, five rural localities in Vladimir Oblast bear this name:

- Zakharovo, Gus-Khrustalny District, Vladimir Oblast, a village in Gus-Khrustalny District
- Zakharovo, Kirzhachsky District, Vladimir Oblast, a village in Kirzhachsky District
- Zakharovo, Muromsky District, Vladimir Oblast, a village in Muromsky District
- Zakharovo, Selivanovsky District, Vladimir Oblast, a selo in Selivanovsky District
- Zakharovo, Sudogodsky District, Vladimir Oblast, a village in Sudogodsky District

== Vologda Oblast ==
As of 2010, nine rural localities in Vologda Oblast bear this name:

- Zakharovo, Dmitriyevsky Selsoviet, Cherepovetsky District, Vologda Oblast, a village in Dmitriyevsky Selsoviet of Cherepovetsky District
- Zakharovo, Musorsky Selsoviet, Cherepovetsky District, Vologda Oblast, a village in Musorsky Selsoviet of Cherepovetsky District
- Zakharovo, Gryazovetsky District, Vologda Oblast, a village in Minkinsky Selsoviet of Gryazovetsky District
- Zakharovo, Kichmengsko-Gorodetsky District, Vologda Oblast, a village in Zakharovsky Selsoviet of Kichmengsko-Gorodetsky District
- Zakharovo, Baydarovsky Selsoviet, Nikolsky District, Vologda Oblast, a village in Baydarovsky Selsoviet of Nikolsky District
- Zakharovo, Vakhnevsky Selsoviet, Nikolsky District, Vologda Oblast, a village in Vakhnevsky Selsoviet of Nikolsky District
- Zakharovo, Sokolsky District, Vologda Oblast, a village in Arkhangelsky Selsoviet of Sokolsky District
- Zakharovo, Markovsky Selsoviet, Vologodsky District, Vologda Oblast, a village in Markovsky Selsoviet of Vologodsky District
- Zakharovo, Spassky Selsoviet, Vologodsky District, Vologda Oblast, a village in Spassky Selsoviet of Vologodsky District

== Yaroslavl Oblast ==
As of 2010, six rural localities in Yaroslavl Oblast bear this name:

- Zakharovo, Breytovsky District, Yaroslavl Oblast, a village in Sevastyantsevsky Rural Okrug of Breytovsky District
- Zakharovo, Dmitriyevsky Rural Okrug, Danilovsky District, Yaroslavl Oblast, a village in Dmitriyevsky Rural Okrug of Danilovsky District
- Zakharovo, Vakhtinsky Rural Okrug, Danilovsky District, Yaroslavl Oblast, a village in Vakhtinsky Rural Okrug of Danilovsky District
- Zakharovo, Pereslavsky District, Yaroslavl Oblast, a village in Andrianovsky Rural Okrug of Pereslavsky District
- Zakharovo, Pervomaysky District, Yaroslavl Oblast, a village in Kolkinsky Rural Okrug of Pervomaysky District
- Zakharovo, Rostovsky District, Yaroslavl Oblast, a village in Perovsky Rural Okrug of Rostovsky District

== Zabaykalsky Krai ==
As of 2010, one rural locality in Zabaykalsky Krai bears this name:

- Zakharovo, Zabaykalsky Krai, a selo in Krasnochikoysky District

== See also ==
- Zakharov (rural locality) (Zakharova), several rural localities in Russia
