= 2013 FIBA Europe Under-20 Championship =

International basketball competition

2013 FIBA U20 European Championship
16th FIBA Under-20 European Basketball Championship

Tournament details
- Host country: Estonia
- Dates: 9 – 21 July 2013
- Teams: 20
- Venues: 2 (in 1 host city)

Final positions
- Champions: Italy (2nd title)

Tournament statistics
- MVP: (Italy) Amedeo Della Valle

Official website
- www.fibaeurope.com

The 2013 FIBA Europe Under-20 Championship was the 16th edition of the FIBA Europe Under-20 Championship. The competition was played in Tallinn, Estonia, from 9 to 21 July 2013. For the first time competition was increased to 20 participating teams from tournament scheme of 16 teams which was introduced in 2005.

== Participating teams ==
- Bulgaria ▲ (4th place, 2012 FIBA Europe Under-20 Championship Division B)
- Croatia ▲ (Winners, 2012 FIBA Europe Under-20 Championship Division B)
- Czech Republic ▲ (Runners-up, 2012 FIBA Europe Under-20 Championship Division B)
- Estonia
- France
- Georgia
- Germany
- Greece
- Israel ▲ (3rd place, 2012 FIBA Europe Under-20 Championship Division B)
- Italy
- Latvia
- Lithuania
- Montenegro
- Russia
- Serbia
- Slovenia
- Spain
- Sweden
- Turkey
- Ukraine

== First round ==
The first-round groups draw took place on 8 December 2012 in Freising, Germany. In this round, the twenty teams were allocated in four groups of five teams each. The top three advanced to the Second Round. The last two teams of each group played in the Classification Games.

=== Group A ===
Pos	Team	Pld	W	L	PF	PA	PD	Pts	Qualification
1	Greece	4	4	0	296	264	+32	8	Advance to second round
2	Lithuania	4	3	1	323	251	+72	7	Advance to second round
3	Germany	4	2	2	273	270	+3	6	Advance to second round
4	Serbia	4	1	3	282	265	+17	5	Classification Group G
5	Georgia	4	0	4	237	259	−22	4	Classification Group H

Source: u20men.fibaeurope.com

9 July 2013
13:30

Boxscore

Germany	89–75	Georgia
Scoring by quarter: 23–15, 24–14, 23–22, 19–24
Pts: Radosavljević 25; Rebs: Radosavljević 7 Asts: Radosavljević 4		Pts: Mikeladze 19; Rebs: Tsirekidze 8 Asts: Mikeladze 4

Saku Suurhall, Tallinn
Attendance: 150
Referees: Alessandro Martolini (ITA), Petr Hrusa (CZE), Boris Krejić (SLO)

9 July 2013
18:00

Boxscore

Serbia	64–68	Lithuania
Scoring by quarter: 15–13, 20–14, 11–24, 18–17
Pts: Mitrović 20; Rebs: Mitrović 10; Asts: Mitrović, Reljić 3		Pts: Kariniauskas 23; Rebs: Riauka 8 Asts: Kariniauskas 3

Saku Suurhall, Tallinn
Attendance: 700
Referees: Miguel Anguel Perez Niz (ESP), Alakbar Hasanov (AZE), Gennadi Ponomarev (RUS)

10 July 2013
15:45

Boxscore

Lithuania	74–62	Germany
Scoring by quarter: 11–14, 23–9, 16–18, 24–21
Pts: Kariniauskas 16; Rebs: Kačinas 6 Asts: four players 2		Pts: Radosavljević 19; Rebs: Tolksdorf 12; Asts: Blessig 4

TTÜ Sports Hall, Tallinn
Attendance: 210
Referees: Juris Kokainis (LAT), Mart Uuehendrik (EST), Marek Maliszewski (POL)

10 July 2013
18:00

Boxscore

Greece	79–73	Serbia
Scoring by quarter: 16–20, 22–15, 16–24, 25–14
Pts: Papapetrou 18; Rebs: three players 5 Asts: Bochoridis, Larentzakis 4		Pts: Marinković 17; Rebs: Marinković 6 Asts: Miljenović 4

TTÜ Sports Hall, Tallinn
Attendance: 150
Referees: Piotr Pastusiak (POL), Alessandro Martolini (ITA), Petr Hrusa (CZE)

11 July 2013
13:30

Boxscore

Germany	56–65	Greece
Scoring by quarter: 12–14, 4–12, 20–18, 20–21
Pts: Brembly 20; Rebs: Brase 10; Asts: Marin 4		Pts: Antetokounmpo 20; Rebs: Kamperidis 8 Asts: Bochoridis, Larentzakis 3

Saku Suurhall, Tallinn
Attendance: 300
Referees: Omer Esteron (ISR), Gennadi Ponomarev (RUS), Igor Mitrovski (MKD)

11 July 2013
18:00

Boxscore

Georgia	49–107	Lithuania
Scoring by quarter: 12–33, 18–30, 10–32, 9–12
Pts: Pkhakadze 15; Rebs: Kvantaliani, Gelazonia 6 Asts: Pkhakadze 2		Pts: Paliukenas 20; Rebs: Chatkevicius 14; Asts: Semaska 5

Saku Suurhall, Tallinn
Attendance: 400
Referees: Tamás Benczur (HUN), Miroslav Tomov (BUL), Alexander Romanov (RUS)

12 July 2013
15:45

Boxscore

Greece	75–61	Georgia
Scoring by quarter: 17–21, 20–20, 27–11, 11–9
Pts: Papapetrou 15; Rebs: Kamperidis, Antetokounmpo 7 Asts: Bochoridis 8		Pts: Tsirekidze 21; Rebs: Gelazonia 8 Asts: Mikeladze 4

TTÜ Sports Hall, Tallinn
Attendance: 100
Referees: Piotr Pastusiak (POL), Mart Uuehendrik (EST), Alakbar Hasanov (AZE)

12 July 2013
18:00

Boxscore

Serbia	56–66	Germany
Scoring by quarter: 17–20, 12–15, 17–16, 10–15
Pts: Bezbradica 17; Rebs: Mitrović 8 Asts: three players 2		Pts: Radosavljević, Blessig 12; Rebs: Brembly 7 Asts: Marin, Blessig 2

TTÜ Sports Hall, Tallinn
Attendance: 25
Referees: Petar Obradović (BIH), Gennadi Ponomarev (RUS), Boris Krejić (SLO)

13 July 2013
13:30

Boxscore

Lithuania	74–77	Greece
Scoring by quarter: 9–19, 18–20, 28–10, 19–28
Pts: Paliukenas 18; Rebs: Riauka 13; Asts: Lekys 4		Pts: Larentzakis 27; Rebs: Melissaratos 10; Asts: Larentzakis 6

Saku Suurhall, Tallinn
Attendance: 300
Referees: Alessandro Martolini (ITA), Marek Maliszewski (POL), Alexander Romanov (RUS)

13 July 2013
13:30

Boxscore

Georgia	52–89	Serbia
Scoring by quarter: 16–21, 15–27, 7–20, 14–21
Pts: three players 8 Rebs: Gelazonia 5 Asts: Mikeladze 4		Pts: Mitrović 16; Rebs: Mitrović 9 Asts: Miljenović 8

TTÜ Sports Hall, Tallinn
Attendance: 100
Referees: Juris Kokainis (LAT), Omer Esteron (ISR), Ciprian Stoica (ROU)

=== Group B ===
Pos	Team	Pld	W	L	PF	PA	PD	Pts	Qualification
1	Turkey	4	3	1	310	291	+19	7 (Note: Montenegro-Turkey 71–84)	Advance to second round
2	Montenegro	4	3	1	324	263	+61	7	Advance to second round
3	Croatia	4	2	2	293	303	−10	6	Advance to second round
4	Sweden	4	1	3	289	328	−39	5 (Note: Ukraine-Sweden 70–76)	Classification Group H
5	Ukraine	4	1	3	277	308	−31	5	Classification Group G

Source: u20men.fibaeurope.com
Notes:

9 July 2013
18:00

Boxscore

Turkey	74–73	Croatia
Scoring by quarter: 23–14, 13–20, 18–20, 20–19
Pts: Çandan 17; Rebs: Erülkü 6 Asts: Eroğlu, Erülkü 3		Pts: Buovac 20; Rebs: Samac 10; Asts: Pandurić 4

TTÜ Sports Hall, Tallinn
Attendance: 100
Referees: Omer Esteron (ISR), Sigmundur Herbertsson (ISL), Mart Uuehendrik (EST)

9 July 2013
20:15

Boxscore

Ukraine	58–83	Montenegro
Scoring by quarter: 10–18, 21–22, 12–21, 15–22
Pts: three players 10; Rebs: Zagreba 7 Asts: Zuikov 5		Pts: Mugoša 30; Rebs: Nikolić, Pavić 8 Asts: Vrbica 5

TTÜ Sports Hall, Tallinn
Attendance: 100
Referees: Juris Kokainis (LAT), Paulo Marques (POR), Miroslav Tomov (BUL)

10 July 2013
13:30

Boxscore

Sweden	73–80	Turkey
Scoring by quarter: 20–20, 18–18, 19–23, 16–19
Pts: Person 21; Rebs: Spires 6 Asts: Person 3		Pts: Çandan 25; Rebs: Çandan 10; Asts: Eroğlu 6

Saku Suurhall, Tallinn
Attendance: 300
Referees: Miguel Anguel Perez Niz (ESP), Jesed Diaz Bloncourt (PUR), Miroslav Tomov (BUL)

10 July 2013
15:45

Boxscore

Croatia	77–75 (OT)	Ukraine
Scoring by quarter: 16–17, 21–10, 21–16, 9–24, Overtime: 10–8
Pts: Pandurić 22; Rebs: Ramljak 8 Asts: Ramljak, Pandurić 4		Pts: Lutsenko 24; Rebs: Koreniuk 11; Asts: Artamonov 7

Saku Suurhall, Tallinn
Attendance: 300
Referees: Omer Esteron (ISR), Damian James Lyons (AUS), Tamás Benczúr (HUN)

11 July 2013
13:30

Boxscore

Montenegro	79–56	Croatia
Scoring by quarter: 26–23, 18–9, 21–12, 14–12
Pts: Mugoša 24; Rebs: Nikolić 10; Asts: three players 3		Pts: Boban 23; Rebs: Buovac, Samac 6 Asts: Segarić 6

TTÜ Sports Hall, Tallinn
Attendance: 75
Referees: Alessandro Martolini (ITA), Alakbar Hasanov (AZE), Boris Krejić (SLO)

11 July 2013
20:15

Boxscore

Ukraine	70–76	Sweden
Scoring by quarter: 20–12, 15–24, 16–21, 19–19
Pts: Koreniuk 23; Rebs: Koreniuk 9 Asts: Furs 2		Pts: Borg 17; Rebs: Person 8 Asts: Person, Borg 2

TTÜ Sports Hall, Tallinn
Attendance: 100
Referees: Piotr Pastusiak (POL), Chrisostomos Schinas (GRE), Ciprian Stoica (ROU)

12 July 2013
15:45

Boxscore

Sweden	65–91	Montenegro
Scoring by quarter: 9–26, 14–19, 15–25, 27–21
Pts: Erhardt 11; Rebs: Spires 9 Asts: Blažević 4		Pts: Nikolić 19; Rebs: Pavić 9 Asts: Mugoša 5

Saku Suurhall, Tallinn
Attendance: 150
Referees: Juris Kokainis (LAT), Tamás Benczur (HUN), Alexander Romanov (RUS)

12 July 2013
20:15

Boxscore

Turkey	72–74	Ukraine
Scoring by quarter: 15–21, 21–16, 23–17, 13–20
Pts: Erdoğan 16; Rebs: Çandan 9 Asts: Altin, Eroğlu 3		Pts: Artamonov 22; Rebs: Furs 10; Asts: Artamonov 8

Saku Suurhall, Tallinn
Attendance: 50
Referees: Marek Maliszewski (POL), Sigmundur Herbertsson (ISL), Petr Hrusa (CZE)

13 July 2013
15:45

Boxscore

Croatia	87–75	Sweden
Scoring by quarter: 22–21, 15–20, 20–14, 30–20
Pts: Boban 23; Rebs: Buovac 8 Asts: Širko 5		Pts: Eriksson 32; Rebs: Spires, Eliasson 6 Asts: Person, Borg 7

Saku Suurhall, Tallinn
Attendance: 350
Referees: Miguel Anguel Perez Niz (ESP), Igor Mitrovski (MKD), Boris Krejić (SLO)

13 July 2013
15:45

Boxscore

Montenegro	71–84	Turkey
Scoring by quarter: 16–24, 10–25, 22–19, 23–16
Pts: Pavić 25; Rebs: Mugoša 7 Asts: Vrbica 7		Pts: Erülkü 21; Rebs: Çandan 11; Asts: Eroğlu 7

TTÜ Sports Hall, Tallinn
Attendance: 100
Referees: Miroslav Tomov (BUL), Mart Uuehendrik (EST), Gennadi Ponomarev (RUS)

=== Group C ===
Pos	Team	Pld	W	L	PF	PA	PD	Pts	Qualification
1	Latvia	4	4	0	333	280	+53	8	Advance to second round
2	Spain	4	3	1	284	254	+30	7	Advance to second round
3	Russia	4	2	2	292	292	0	6	Advance to second round
4	Israel	4	1	3	248	294	−46	5	Classification Group G
5	Bulgaria	4	0	4	266	303	−37	4	Classification Group H

Source: u20men.fibaeurope.com

9 July 2013
13:30

Boxscore

Spain	76–54	Russia
Scoring by quarter: 27–15, 10–15, 18–11, 21–13
Pts: Díez 23; Rebs: Saiz 9 Asts: Vives 7		Pts: Gudumak 15; Rebs: Trushkin 12; Asts: Komolov, Sokolov 2

TTÜ Sports Hall, Tallinn
Attendance: 300
Referees: Miodrag Ličina (SRB), Gintaras Vitkauskas (LTU), Ciprian Stoica (ROU)

9 July 2013
15:45

Boxscore

Latvia	87–59	Israel
Scoring by quarter: 20–18, 21–18, 23–9, 23–14
Pts: Jakovics 26; Rebs: Silins 9 Asts: Vecvagars, Jakovics 3		Pts: Maayan 14; Rebs: Solomon 11; Asts: Maayan 5

TTÜ Sports Hall, Tallinn
Attendance: 150
Referees: Petar Obradović (BIH), Moritz Reiter (GER), Ognjen Jokić (MNE)

10 July 2013
18:00

Boxscore

Russia	85–89 (OT)	Latvia
Scoring by quarter: 16–19, 23–21, 20–18, 16–17, Overtime: 10–14
Pts: Trushkin 21; Rebs: Gudumak 14; Asts: Sokolov 3		Pts: Vecvagars 25; Rebs: Grazulis 16; Asts: Bērziņš 4

Saku Suurhall, Tallinn
Attendance: 300
Referees: Chrisostomos Schinas (GRE), Sergiy Chebyshev (UKR), Ersan Kartal (TUR)

10 July 2013
20:15

Boxscore

Bulgaria	64–78	Spain
Scoring by quarter: 15–17, 19–21, 11–21, 19–19
Pts: Ivanov 15; Rebs: Simeonov 8 Asts: Dimitrov 3		Pts: Fernández 21; Rebs: Fernández, Díez 5 Asts: Fernández 5

Saku Suurhall, Tallinn
Attendance: 300
Referees: Paulo Marques (POR), Alakbar Hasanov (AZE), Sigmundur Herbertsson (ISL)

11 July 2013
15:45

Boxscore

Israel	60–78	Russia
Scoring by quarter: 13–20, 11–21, 20–16, 16–21
Pts: Mayor 16; Rebs: Ginat 10; Asts: Maayan, Dawson 3		Pts: Zakharov 20; Rebs: Gudumak 8 Asts: Komolov 5

TTÜ Sports Hall, Tallinn
Attendance: 200
Referees: Jesed Diaz Bloncourt (PUR), Petr Hrusa (CZE), Luka Kardum (CRO)

11 July 2013
18:00

Boxscore

Latvia	82–69	Bulgaria
Scoring by quarter: 18–16, 16–14, 25–18, 23–21
Pts: Bērziņš 19; Rebs: Silins 13; Asts: three players 3		Pts: Ivanov 20; Rebs: Dimitrov 7 Asts: Ivanov, Karamfilov 2

TTÜ Sports Hall, Tallinn
Attendance: 100
Referees: Miguel Anguel Perez Niz (ESP), David Berekashvili (GEO), Moritz Reiter (GER)

12 July 2013
13:30

Boxscore

Bulgaria	66–68	Israel
Scoring by quarter: 12–19, 20–22, 19–7, 15–20
Pts: Simeonov 15; Rebs: Simeonov 8 Asts: Dimitrov, Natskin 4		Pts: Menco 14; Rebs: Maayan 7 Asts: Maayan 9

Saku Suurhall, Tallinn
Attendance: 100
Referees: Miodrag Ličina (SRB), Sergiy Chebyshev (UKR), Ersan Kartal (TUR)

12 July 2013
18:00

Boxscore

Spain	67–75	Latvia
Scoring by quarter: 19–17, 21–21, 5–20, 22–17
Pts: Díez 16; Rebs: Díez 12; Asts: Fernández		Pts: Vecvagars 22; Rebs: Silins 12; Asts: Jakovics 4

Saku Suurhall, Tallinn
Attendance: 350
Referees: Gintaras Vitkauskas (LTU), Damian James Lyons (AUS), Luka Kardum (CRO)

13 July 2013
18:00

Boxscore

Russia	75–67	Bulgaria
Scoring by quarter: 20–15, 15–17, 22–16, 18–19
Pts: Gudumak 18; Rebs: Loginov 8 Asts: Zakharov 4		Pts: Dimitrov 20; Rebs: three players 6 Asts: Karamfilov 5

TTÜ Sports Hall, Tallinn
Attendance: 100
Referees: Alakbar Hasanov (AZE), Ognjen Jokić (MNE), Luka Kardum (CRO)

13 July 2013
18:00

Boxscore

Israel	61–63	Spain
Scoring by quarter: 15–17, 14–17, 13–9, 19–20
Pts: Koulechov 21; Rebs: Solomon 12; Asts: Maayan 4		Pts: Díez 23; Rebs: Suarez 8 Asts: Costa 4

Saku Suurhall, Tallinn
Attendance: 450
Referees: Petar Obradović (BIH), Jesed Diaz Bloncourt (PUR), David Berekashvili (GEO)

=== Group D ===
Pos	Team	Pld	W	L	PF	PA	PD	Pts	Qualification
1	France	4	3	1	276	235	+41	7 (Note: France 3pts/131:129 (+2) :: Italy-France 76–70, France-Slovenia 61–53)	Advance to second round
2	Italy	4	3	1	316	288	+28	7 (Note: Italy 3pts/137:135 (+2) :: Italy-France 76–70, Italy-Slovenia 61–65)	Advance to second round
3	Slovenia	4	3	1	275	263	+12	7 (Note: Slovenia 3pts/118:122 (-4) :: France-Slovenia 61–53, Italy-Slovenia 61–65)	Advance to second round
4	Estonia	4	1	3	266	293	−27	5	Classification Group H
5	Czech Republic	4	0	4	267	321	−54	4	Classification Group G

Source: u20men.fibaeurope.com
Notes:

9 July 2013
15:45

Boxscore

Italy	76–70	France
Scoring by quarter: 17–26, 19–16, 18–12, 22–16
Pts: Laganà 16; Rebs: three players 6 Asts: Imbrò 6		Pts: Invernizzi, Jaiteh 15; Rebs: Jaiteh 8 Asts: Invernizzi, Dallo 5

Saku Suurhall, Tallinn
Attendance: 500
Referees: Sergiy Chebyshev (UKR), Chrisostomos Schinas (GRE), Igor Mitrovski (MKD)

9 July 2013
20:45

Boxscore

Slovenia	79–69	Estonia
Scoring by quarter: 20–25, 27–20, 17–15, 15–9
Pts: Lapornik 21; Rebs: Lapornik 8 Asts: three players 3		Pts: Laane, Paasoja 12; Rebs: Nurger 9 Asts: Laane 3

Saku Suurhall, Tallinn
Attendance: 3,000
Referees: Piotr Pastusiak (POL), Ersan Kartal (TUR), David Berekashvili (GEO)

10 July 2013
13:30

Boxscore

Czech Republic	75–89	Italy
Scoring by quarter: 13–23, 19–27, 22–23, 21–16
Pts: Faifr 21; Rebs: Kríz, Faifr 7 Asts: Siska 4		Pts: Tonut 14; Rebs: Lombardi, Cefarelli 4 Asts: Imbrò, Ruzzier 3

TTÜ Sports Hall, Tallinn
Attendance: 100
Referees: Petar Obradović (BIH), Gintaras Vitkauskas (LTU), Luka Kardum (CRO)

10 July 2013
20:15

Boxscore

France	61–53	Slovenia
Scoring by quarter: 14–10, 13–12, 18–20, 16–11
Pts: Jean-Charles 18; Rebs: Jaiteh 12; Asts: Turpin 4		Pts: Rupnik 18; Rebs: Dimec 7 Asts: Rupnik 4

TTÜ Sports Hall, Tallinn
Attendance: 100
Referees: Moritz Reiter (GER), Ognjen Jokić (MNE), Alexander Romanov (RUS)

11 July 2013
15:45

Boxscore

Slovenia	78–72	Czech Republic
Scoring by quarter: 17–15, 21–19, 17–24, 23–14
Pts: Dimec 24; Rebs: Dimec 7 Asts: Rojc 4		Pts: Kyzlink 21; Rebs: Kríz 8 Asts: four players 1

Saku Suurhall, Tallinn
Attendance: 300
Referees: Damian James Lyons (AUS), Marek Maliszewski (POL), Paulo Marques (POR)

11 July 2013
20:15

Boxscore

Estonia	44–66	France
Scoring by quarter: 13–19, 11–10, 10–18, 10–19
Pts: Nurger 14; Rebs: Paasoja 5 Asts: Three players 1		Pts: Jean-Charles 18; Rebs: Jean-Charles 10; Asts: Three players 3

Saku Suurhall, Tallinn
Attendance: 5,000
Referees: Gintaras Vitkauskas (LTU), Miodrag Ličina (SRB), Sigmundur Herbertsson (ISL)

12 July 2013
13:30

Boxscore

Italy	61–65	Slovenia
Scoring by quarter: 14–11, 22–18, 13–21, 12–15
Pts: Della Valle 13; Rebs: Landi 8 Asts: Abass 3		Pts: Dimec 16; Rebs: Bolčina 12; Asts: Dimec 4

TTÜ Sports Hall, Tallinn
Attendance: 100
Referees: Paulo Marques (POR), Ognjen Jokić (MNE), Ciprian Stoica (ROU)

12 July 2013
20:15

Boxscore

Czech Republic	58–75	Estonia
Scoring by quarter: 15–21, 9–11, 25–23, 9–20
Pts: Fait 19; Rebs: Faifr 12; Asts: Prihonsky, Kríz 3		Pts: Metsalu 21; Rebs: Metsalu 8 Asts: Laane, Saare 6

TTÜ Sports Hall, Tallinn
Attendance: 2,500
Referees: Chrisostomos Schinas (GRE), Moritz Reiter (GER), Jesed Diaz Bloncourt (PUR)

13 July 2013
20:15

Boxscore

France	79–62	Czech Republic
Scoring by quarter: 19–7, 14–16, 23–20, 23–19
Pts: Ivernizzi, Jean-Charles 19; Rebs: Jaiteh 9 Asts: Dallo, Turpin 2		Pts: Kyzlink 22; Rebs: Kríz 10; Asts: five players 1

TTÜ Sports Hall, Tallinn
Attendance: 100
Referees: Miodrag Ličina (SRB), Sergiy Chebyshev (UKR), Paulo Marques (POR)

13 July 2013
20:15

Boxscore

Estonia	78–90	Italy
Scoring by quarter: 14–22, 26–31, 19–11, 19–26
Pts: Laane 24; Rebs: Metsalu 7 Asts: Laane 5		Pts: Della Valle 20; Rebs: Lombardi, Chillo 8 Asts: Lombardi 4

Saku Suurhall, Tallinn
Attendance: 3,000
Referees: Tamas Benczur (HUN), Ersan Kartal (TUR), Damian James Lyons (AUS)

== Second round ==
Team advances to the Quarterfinals
Team will compete in the 9th–12th playoffs

=== Group E ===
Team	Pld	W	L	PF	PA	PD	Pts
Turkey	5	4	1	347	333	+14	9
Greece	5	4	1	359	317	+42	9
Lithuania	5	3	2	329	312	+17	8
Montenegro	5	2	3	328	337	−9	7
Croatia	5	1	4	328	361	−33	6
Germany	5	1	4	314	345	−31	6

15 July 2013
15:45

Report

Montenegro	56–63	Lithuania
Scoring by quarter: 17–5, 17–16, 14–20, 8–22
Pts: Mugoša 16; Rebs: Mugoša, Pavić 9 Asts: Latković 3		Pts: Kačinas 15; Rebs: Chatkevičius 7 Asts: Juknevičius 5

TTÜ Sports Hall, Tallinn
Attendance: 200
Referees: Miguel Anguel Perez Niz (ESP), Omer Esteron (ISR), Sigmundur Herbertsson (ISL)

15 July 2013
18:00

Report

Croatia	68–77	Greece
Scoring by quarter: 16–18, 14–18, 19–20, 19–21
Pts: Širko 17; Rebs: Ramljak 9 Asts: Pandurić 8		Pts: Larentzakis 25; Rebs: Antetokounmpo 15; Asts: Bochoridis 5

TTÜ Sports Hall, Tallinn
Attendance: 150
Referees: Paulo Marques (POR), Marek Maliszewski (POL), Igor Mitrovski (MKD)

15 July 2013
20:15

Report

Germany	71–65	Turkey
Scoring by quarter: 18–13, 19–16, 14–18, 20–18
Pts: Radosavljevic 19; Rebs: Brembly 6 Asts: Blessig 4		Pts: Tekin 15; Rebs: Tekin 8 Asts: Three players 2

TTÜ Sports Hall, Tallinn
Attendance: 200
Referees: Miodrag Ličina (SRB), Tamás Benczur (HUN), David Brekashvili (GEO)

16 July 2013
15:45

Report

Croatia	66–61	Germany
Scoring by quarter: 18–9, 11–17, 20–17, 17–18
Pts: Buovac 16; Rebs: Samac 13; Asts: Sirko 5		Pts: Brembly 13; Rebs: Richter 7 Asts: Brembly 3

Saku Suurhall, Tallinn
Attendance: 250
Referees: Miodrag Ličina (SRB), Alakbar Hasanov (AZE), Gennadi Ponomarev (RUS)

16 July 2013
18:00

Report

Greece	70–47	Montenegro
Scoring by quarter: 16–12, 14–7, 29–7, 11–21
Pts: Papapetrou 17; Rebs: Antetokounmpo 12; Asts: Antetokounmpo 7		Pts: Pavić 12; Rebs: Miković, Pavić 6 Asts: Latković 3

Saku Suurhall, Tallinn
Attendance: 300
Referees: Alessandro Martolini (ITA), Sergiy Chebyshev (UKR), Sigmundur Herbertsson (ISL)

16 July 2013
20:15

Report

Lithuania	48–52	Turkey
Scoring by quarter: 10–14, 12–13, 4–8, 22–17
Pts: Kariniauskas 9 Rebs: Chatkevičius 12; Asts: Kariniauskas, Semaška 3		Pts: Geyik 21; Rebs: Çandan, Geyik 7 Asts: Eroğlu 8

Saku Suurhall, Tallinn
Attendance: 300
Referees: Miguel Anguel Perez Niz (ESP), Juris Kokainis (LAT), Ciprian Stoica (ROU)

17 July 2013
15:45

Report

Montenegro	75–64	Germany
Scoring by quarter: 22–12, 18–16, 14–17, 21–19
Pts: Vrbica 30; Rebs: Pavić 9 Asts: Vrbica 5		Pts: Radosavljević 22; Rebs: Richter 5 Asts: Merz 4

TTÜ Sports Hall, Tallinn
Attendance: 75
Referees: Miguel Anguel Perez Niz (ESP), Petr Hrusa (CZE), Mart Uuehendrik (EST)

17 July 2013
18:00

Report

Lithuania	70–65	Croatia
Scoring by quarter: 14–14, 19–13, 19–20, 18–18
Pts: Kariniauskas 24; Rebs: Chatkevičius 12; Asts: Kariniauskas 9		Pts: Pandurić, Samac 13; Rebs: Three players 5 Asts: Pandurić, Segarić 6

TTÜ Sports Hall, Tallinn
Attendance: 100
Referees: Alessandro Martolini (ITA), Juris Kokainis (LAT), Ciprian Stoica (ROU)

17 July 2013
20:15

Report

Turkey	72–70	Greece
Scoring by quarter: 20–11, 16–16, 17–27, 19–16
Pts: Eroğlu 23; Rebs: Çandan 7 Asts: Erülkü 3		Pts: Bochoridis 24; Rebs: Antetokounmpo 11; Asts: Bochoridis 3

TTÜ Sports Hall, Tallinn
Attendance: 300
Referees: Miodrag Ličina (SRB), Jesed Diaz Bloncourt (PUR), Damian James Lyons (AUS)

=== Group F ===
Team	Pld	W	L	PF	PA	PD	Pts
Latvia	5	4	1	404	384	+20	9
Italy	5	3	2	382	366	+16	8
Spain	5	2	3	358	332	+26	7
Russia	5	2	3	362	383	−21	7
France	5	2	3	323	338	−15	7
Slovenia	5	2	3	334	360	−26	7

15 July 2013
15:45

Report

Italy	76–73	Spain
Scoring by quarter: 21–22, 14–15, 16–22, 25–14
Pts: Della Valle 27; Rebs: Abass 12; Asts: Ruzzier 4		Pts: Diez 20; Rebs: Diez 9 Asts: Fernández 4

Saku Suurhall, Tallinn
Attendance: 250
Referees: Sergiy Chebyshev (UKR), Petr Hrusa (CZE), Jesed Diaz Bloncourt (PUR)

15 July 2013
18:00

Report

Slovenia	72–78	Latvia
Scoring by quarter: 20–20, 11–20, 19–17, 22–21
Pts: Bolčina 14; Rebs: Bolčina 11; Asts: Bratož 3		Pts: Jakovics 20; Rebs: Grazulis 10; Asts: Vecvagars, Jakovics 4

Saku Suurhall, Tallinn
Attendance: 300
Referees: Petar Obradović (BIH), Damian James Lyons (AUS), Mart Uuehendrik (EST)

15 July 2013
20:15

Report

Russia	65–61	France
Scoring by quarter: 16–13, 15–19, 17–19, 17–10
Pts: Loginov 13; Rebs: Zakharov 7 Asts: Zakharov, Trushkin 3		Pts: Jaiteh 19; Rebs: Jaiteh 11; Asts: Invernizzi 3

Saku Suurhall, Tallinn
Attendance: 400
Referees: Piotr Patusiak (POL), Moritz Reiter (GER), Miroslav Tomov (BUL)

16 July 2013
15:45

Report

Slovenia	69–88	Russia
Scoring by quarter: 19–19, 18–25, 14–23, 18–21
Pts: Dimec, Lapornik 14; Rebs: Hrovat 6 Asts: Rupnik 6		Pts: Zakharov 20; Rebs: Gudumak, Zakharov 5 Asts: Zakharov, Komolov 5

TTÜ Sports Hall, Tallinn
Attendance: 100
Referees: Omer Esteron (ISR), Moritz Reiter (GER), Miroslav Tomov (BUL)

16 July 2013
18:00

Report

Latvia	88–81	Italy
Scoring by quarter: 23–16, 19–16, 28–22, 18–27
Pts: Silins 25; Rebs: Silins 10; Asts: Jakovics 6		Pts: Abass 21; Rebs: Landi 7 Asts: Imbrò 6

TTÜ Sports Hall, Tallinn
Attendance: 230
Referees: Chrisostomos Schinas (GRE), Paulo Marques (POR), Luka Kardum (CRO)

16 July 2013
20:15

Report

Spain	70–52	France
Scoring by quarter: 17–7, 12–15, 23–16, 18–14
Pts: Vives 16; Rebs: Motos 8 Asts: Fernández 8		Pts: Three players 11; Rebs: Jaiteh 9 Asts: Three players 2

TTÜ Sports Hall, Tallinn
Attendance: 200
Referees: Petar Obradović (BIH), Gintaras Vitkauskas (LTU), Ognjen Jokić (MNE)

17 July 2013
15:45

Report

Italy	88–70	Russia
Scoring by quarter: 27–14, 18–21, 26–19, 17–16
Pts: Landi 26; Rebs: Lombardi 7 Asts: Ruzzier 4		Pts: Gudumak 17; Rebs: Rogozhkin 8 Asts: Zakharov 7

Saku Suurhall, Tallinn
Attendance: 500
Referees: Petar Obradović (BIH), Ersan Kartal (TUR), Tamás Benczur (HUN)

17 July 2013
18:00

Report

Spain	72–75	Slovenia
Scoring by quarter: 14–23, 16–18, 21–10, 21–24
Pts: Vives 24; Rebs: Diez 9 Asts: Sanz 3		Pts: Rupnik 20; Rebs: Bolčina 13; Asts: Dimec, Lapornik 3

Saku Suurhall, Tallinn
Attendance: 500
Referees: Chrisostomos Schinas (GRE), Gintaras Vitkauskas (LTU), Igor Mitrovski (MKD)

17 July 2013
20:15

Report

France	79–74	Latvia
Scoring by quarter: 27–19, 21–21, 18–11, 13–23
Pts: Howard 17; Rebs: Howard, Maille 6 Asts: Invernizzi 4		Pts: Rekis 16; Rebs: Grazulis 8 Asts: Leimanis 7

Saku Suurhall, Tallinn
Attendance: 500
Referees: Paulo Marques (POR), Sergiy Chebyshev (UKR), Marek Maliszewski (POL)

== Classification groups for 13th – 20th places ==
=== Group G ===
Team	Pld	W	L	PF	PA	PD	Pts
Serbia	3	3	0	232	197	+35	6
Israel	3	2	1	223	214	+9	5
Ukraine	3	1	2	230	242	−12	4
Czech Republic	3	0	3	225	257	−32	3

15 July 2013
11:15

Report

Ukraine	72–84	Israel
Scoring by quarter: 25–20, 18–17, 10–20, 19–27
Pts: Koreniuk 23; Rebs: Lutsenko 12; Asts: Artamonov 8		Pts: Solomon 23; Rebs: Solomon 13; Asts: Maayan 8

Saku Suurhall, Tallinn
Attendance: 50
Referees: Chrisostomos Schinas (GRE), Ersan Kartal (TUR), Alexander Romanov (RUS)

15 July 2013
13:30

Report

Serbia	91–66	Czech Republic
Scoring by quarter: 26–14, 10–19, 26–16, 29–17
Pts: Mitrović 20; Rebs: Mitrović 10; Asts: Miljenović, Reljić 5		Pts: Kríz 16; Rebs: Fait 7 Asts: Prihonsky 3

Saku Suurhall, Tallinn
Attendance: 150
Referees: Gintaras Vitkauskas (LTU), Ciprian Stoica (ROU), Gennadi Ponomarev (RUS)

16 July 2013
11:15

Report

Israel	62–66	Serbia
Scoring by quarter: 16–18, 12–18, 19–14, 15–16
Pts: Koulechov 16; Rebs: Koulechov 13; Asts: Maayan 6		Pts: Marinković 15; Rebs: Marinković 10; Asts: Miljenović, Mitrović 3

TTÜ Sports Hall, Tallinn
Attendance: 100
Referees: Marek Maliszewski (POL), Jesed Diaz Bloncourt (PUR), Boris Krejić (SLO)

16 July 2013
13:30

Report

Czech Republic	83–89	Ukraine
Scoring by quarter: 19–29, 22–27, 16–24, 26–9
Pts: Kríz 25; Rebs: Prihonsky 7 Asts: Kyzlink, Siska 5		Pts: Koreniuk 22; Rebs: Three players 7 Asts: Artamonov 9

TTÜ Sports Hall, Tallinn
Attendance: 100
Referees: Tamás Benczur (HUN), Mart Uuehendrik (EST), David Berekashvili (GEO)

17 July 2013
11:15

Report

Serbia	75–69	Ukraine
Scoring by quarter: 28–19, 15–21, 17–18, 15–11
Pts: Avramović 19; Rebs: Mitrović 9 Asts: Milošević 4		Pts: Artamonov, Koreniuk 16; Rebs: Koreniuk 16; Asts: Zuikov 4

Saku Suurhall, Tallinn
Attendance: 100
Referees: Piotr Pastusiak (POL), Sigmundur Herbertsson (ISL), Miroslav Tomov (BUL)

17 July 2013
13:30

Report

Israel	77–76	Czech Republic
Scoring by quarter: 20–15, 12–23, 15–16, 30–22
Pts: Maayan 16; Rebs: Solomon 11; Asts: Maayan 5		Pts: Kríz, Faifr 22; Rebs: Kríz 12; Asts: Kríz, Prihonsky 4

Saku Suurhall, Tallinn
Attendance: 100
Referees: Moritz Reiter (GER), Gennadi Ponomarev (RUS), Alexander Romanov (RUS)

=== Group H ===
Team	Pld	W	L	PF	PA	PD	Pts
Bulgaria	3	3	0	214	159	+55	6
Sweden	3	2	1	200	192	+8	5
Estonia	3	1	2	201	197	+4	4
Georgia	3	0	3	158	225	−67	3

15 July 2013
11:15

Report

Sweden	57–61	Bulgaria
Scoring by quarter: 15–11, 14–14, 14–14, 14–22
Pts: Eliasson 15; Rebs: Spires 12; Asts: Person 4		Pts: Natskin 14; Rebs: Dimitrov 6 Asts: Ivanov 4

TTÜ Sports Hall, Tallinn
Attendance: 100
Referees: Juris Kokainis (LAT), Alakbar Hasanov (AZE), Luka Kardum (CRO)

15 July 2013
13:30

Report

Georgia	52–74	Estonia
Scoring by quarter: 16–20, 12–22, 7–17, 17–15
Pts: Pkhakadze 13; Rebs: Gelazonia 14; Asts: Rogava 2		Pts: Paasoja 25; Rebs: Metsalu 14; Asts: Laane 8

TTÜ Sports Hall, Tallinn
Attendance: 800
Referees: Alessandro Martolini (ITA), Ognjen Jokić (MNE), Boris Krejić (SLO)

16 July 2013
11:15

Report

Bulgaria	85–44	Georgia
Scoring by quarter: 21–9, 27–12, 18–9, 19–14
Pts: Minkov 15; Rebs: Dimitrov 10; Asts: Ivanov, Stoyanov 4		Pts: Pkhakadze 14; Rebs: Phkhadze 5 Asts: Pkhakadze 3

Saku Suurhall, Tallinn
Attendance: 100
Referees: Damian James Lyons (AUS), Petr Hrusa (CZE), Alexnder Romanov (RUS)

16 July 2013
13:30

Report

Estonia	69–77	Sweden
Scoring by quarter: 23–18, 19–14, 12–25, 15–20
Pts: Laane 21; Rebs: Schleicher, Metsalu 8 Asts: Laane, Saare 2		Pts: Eriksson 24; Rebs: Spires 14; Asts: Person 3

Saku Suurhall, Tallinn
Attendance: 500
Referees: Piotr Pastusiak (POL), Ersan Kartal (TUR), Igor Mitrovski (MKD)

17 July 2013
11:15

Report

Georgia	62–66	Sweden
Scoring by quarter: 19–16, 16–19, 17–17, 10–14
Pts: Rogava 19; Rebs: Gelazonia, Kvantaliani 7 Asts: Three players 2		Pts: Larsson 15; Rebs: Spires 15; Asts: Eliasson 4

TTÜ Sports Hall, Tallinn
Attendance: 100
Referees: Omer Esteron (ISR), Alakbar Hasanov (AZE), Luka Kardum (CRO)

17 July 2013
13:30

Report

Bulgaria	68–58	Estonia
Scoring by quarter: 19–17, 9–9, 19–20, 21–12
Pts: Ivanov 16; Rebs: Dimitrov 14; Asts: Dimitrov 4		Pts: Schleicher 12; Rebs: Metsalu 9 Asts: Laane 4

TTÜ Sports Hall, Tallinn
Attendance: 400
Referees: Ognjen Jokic (MNE), David Berekashvili (GEO), Boris Krejić (SLO)

== Classification playoffs for 9th – 20th place ==
=== Classification games for 17th – 20th place ===
Semi-finals
19 July 2013
Ukraine	75
Georgia	47
19 July 2013
Estonia	68
Czech Republic	94

Seventeenth place
21 July 2013
Ukraine	68
Czech Republic	75
Nineteenth place
21 July 2013
Georgia	70
Estonia	79

19 July 2013
11:15

Report

Ukraine	75–47	Georgia
Scoring by quarter: 14–10, 19–10, 22–9, 20–18
Pts: Koreniuk 26; Rebs: Koreniuk 19; Asts: Artamonov 10		Pts: Kvantaliani 11; Rebs: Kvantaliani 12; Asts: Mikeladze, Rogava 2

Saku Suurhall, Tallinn
Attendance: 100
Referees: Sigmundur Herbertsson (ISL), Miroslav Tomov (BUL), Boris Krejić (SLO)

19 July 2013
11:15

Report

Estonia	68–94	Czech Republic
Scoring by quarter: 24–27, 15–21, 14–28, 15–18
Pts: Metsalu 16; Rebs: Paasoja 6 Asts: Saare 4		Pts: Kríz 24; Rebs: Kríz 14; Asts: Kríz 5

TTÜ Sports Hall, Tallinn
Attendance: 700
Referees: Juris Kokainis (LAT), Damian James Lyons (AUS), Luka Kardum (CRO)

==== Match for 19th place ====
21 July 2013
9:00

Report

Georgia	70–79	Estonia
Scoring by quarter: 16–23, 23–21, 10–23, 21–12
Pts: Mikeladze 18; Rebs: Jintcharadze 13; Asts: Mikeladze 5		Pts: Paasoja 20; Rebs: Metsalu, Nurger 10; Asts: Laane 5

TTÜ Sports Hall, Tallinn
Attendance: 100
Referees: Sigmundur Herbertsson (ISL), Gennadi Ponomarev (RUS), Alexander Romanov (RUS)

==== Match for 17th place ====
21 July 2013
11:15

Report

Ukraine	68–75	Czech Republic
Scoring by quarter: 20–15, 13–14, 12–20, 23–26
Pts: Artamonov 25; Rebs: Koreniuk 15; Asts: Artamonov 9		Pts: Kyzlink 21; Rebs: Kríz 10; Asts: Kríz 6

TTÜ Sports Hall, Tallinn
Attendance: 50
Referees: Marek Maliszewski (POL), Moritz Reiter (GER), Jesed Diaz Bloncourt (PUR)

=== Classification games for 13th – 16th place ===
Semi-finals
19 July 2013
Serbia	82
Sweden	65
19 July 2013
Bulgaria	76
Israel	69

Thirteenth place
21 July 2013
Serbia	76
Bulgaria	70
Sixteenth place
21 July 2013
Sweden	81
Israel	82

19 July 2013
13:30

Report

Serbia	82–65	Sweden
Scoring by quarter: 23–12, 18–15, 22–14, 19–24
Pts: Krstić 22; Rebs: Marinković 12; Asts: Miljenović 9		Pts: Eriksson 28; Rebs: Spires 6 Asts: Person 3

TTÜ Sports Hall, Tallinn
Attendance: 100
Referees: Jesed Diaz Bloncourt (PUR), Alakbar Hasanov (AZE), Gennadi Ponomarev (RUS)

19 July 2013
15:45

Report

Bulgaria	76–69	Israel
Scoring by quarter: 21–14, 15–16, 22–16, 18–23
Pts: Simeonov 16; Rebs: Dimitrov 6 Asts: Ivanov 5		Pts: Menco 17; Rebs: Solomon 10; Asts: Mayor 6

TTÜ Sports Hall, Tallinn
Attendance: 100
Referees: Sergiy Chebyshev (UKR), Ciprian Stoica (ROU), David Berekashvili (GEO)

==== Match for 15th place ====
21 July 2013
13:30

Report

Sweden	81–82	Israel
Scoring by quarter: 19–24, 21–20, 21–21, 20–17
Pts: Eriksson 18; Rebs: Spires 7 Asts: Borg 6		Pts: Koulechov 18; Rebs: Ginat 9 Asts: Maayan 7

TTÜ Sports Hall, Tallinn
Attendance: 50
Referees: Piotr Pastusiak (POL), Mart Uuehendrik (EST), David Berekashvili (GEO)

==== Match for 13th place ====
21 July 2013
15:45

Report

Serbia	76–70	Bulgaria
Scoring by quarter: 19–13, 15–24, 13–24, 29–9
Pts: Andrić 23; Rebs: Mitrović 11; Asts: Miljenović 8		Pts: Simeonov 22; Rebs: Simeonov 8 Asts: Natskin, Ivanov 4

TTÜ Sports Hall, Tallinn
Attendance: 75
Referees: Omer Esteron (ISR), Luka Kardum (CRO), Boris Krejić (SLO)

=== Classification games for 9th – 12th place ===
Semi-finals
19 July 2013
Croatia	78
Slovenia	90
19 July 2013
France	71
Germany	62

Ninth place
21 July 2013
Slovenia	69
France	78
Twelfth place
21 July 2013
Croatia	65
Germany	76

19 July 2013
18:00

Report

Croatia	78–90	Slovenia
Scoring by quarter: 23–19, 19–22, 19–18, 17–31
Pts: Samac, Boban 18; Rebs: Ramljak 5 Asts: Segarić 7		Pts: Lapornik 19; Rebs: Bolčina 16; Asts: Rupnik 10

TTÜ Sports Hall, Tallinn
Attendance: 100
Referees: Omer Esteron (ISR), Mart Uuehendrik (EST), Alexander Romanov (RUS)

19 July 2013
20:15

Report

France	71–62	Germany
Scoring by quarter: 11–13, 19–20, 21–14, 20–15
Pts: Jaiteh 16; Rebs: Howard 5 Asts: Invernizzi 4		Pts: Radosavljević 15; Rebs: Radosavljević 6 Asts: Marin 2

TTÜ Sports Hall, Tallinn
Attendance: 100
Referees: Chrisostomos Schinas (GRE), Igor Mitrovski (MKD), Tamás Benczur (HUN)

==== Match for 11th place ====
21 July 2013
18:00

Report

Croatia	65–76	Germany
Scoring by quarter: 24–11, 17–16, 15–25, 9–24
Pts: Samac 20; Rebs: Samac 12; Asts: Four players 2		Pts: Marin 15; Rebs: Brembly, Tolksdorf 6 Asts: Four players 2

TTÜ Sports Hall, Tallinn
Attendance: 50
Referees: Miodrag Ličina (SRB), Igor Mitrovski (MKD), Damian James Lyons (AUS)

==== Match for 9th place ====
21 July 2013
11:15

Report

Slovenia	69–78	France
Scoring by quarter: 22–17, 13–25, 21–18, 13–18
Pts: Lapornik 19; Rebs: Bolčina 19; Asts: Rupnik 10		Pts: Howard 19; Rebs: Dallo, Jaiteh 8 Asts: Invernizzi 5

Saku Suurhall, Tallinn
Attendance: 100
Referees: Chrisostomos Schinas (GRE), Alakbar Hasanov (AZE), Miroslav Tomov (BUL)

== Championship playoffs ==
Quarter-finals
19 July 2013
Turkey	70
Russia	82
19 July 2013
Italy	75
Lithuania	72
19 July 2013
Latvia	78
Montenegro	73
19 July 2013
Greece	60
Spain	82

Semi-finals
20 July 2013
Russia	68
Italy	77
20 July 2013
Latvia	64
Spain	63

Final
21 July 2013
Italy	67
Latvia	60
Third place
21 July 2013
Russia	63
Spain	70

=== Quarterfinals ===
19 July 2013
13:30

Report

Turkey	70–82	Russia
Scoring by quarter: 7–26, 24–24, 15–14, 24–18
Pts: Tekin 15; Rebs: Geyik 7 Asts: Tunçer 4		Pts: Zakharov 24; Rebs: Gudumak 5 Asts: Zakharov 6

Saku Suurhall, Tallinn
Attendance: 400
Referees: Miguel Anguel Perez Niz (ESP), Ognjen Jokić (MNE), Petr Hrusa (CZE)

19 July 2013
15:45

Report

Latvia	78–73	Montenegro
Scoring by quarter: 20–27, 19–10, 13–13, 26–23
Pts: Vecvagars 25; Rebs: Grazulis 11; Asts: Jakovics 5		Pts: Latković 18; Rebs: Nikolić 8 Asts: Vrbica 6

Saku Suurhall, Tallinn
Attendance: 500
Referees: Alessandro Martolini (ITA), Miodrag Ličina (SRB), Gintaras Vitkauskas (LTU)

19 July 2013
18:00

Report

Greece	60–82	Spain
Scoring by quarter: 16–20, 21–20, 8–22, 15–20
Pts: Larentazakis 15; Rebs: Papapetrou 8 Asts: Bochoridis, Larentazakis 4		Pts: Diez 23; Rebs: Diez 9 Asts: Fernández 6

Saku Suurhall, Tallinn
Attendance: 1,000
Referees: Petar Obradović (BIH), Paulo Marques (POR), Ersan Kartal (TUR)

19 July 2013
20:15

Report

Italy	75–72 (OT)	Lithuania
Scoring by quarter: 18–23, 9–10, 19–11, 21–23, Overtime: 8–5
Pts: Lombardi 16; Rebs: Lombardi 10; Asts: Laganà 4		Pts: Olisevičius 14; Rebs: Kacinas, Chatkevičius 9 Asts: Lekys, Kariniauskas 4

Saku Suurhall, Tallinn
Attendance: 1,000
Referees: Piotr Pastusiak (POL), Moritz Reiter (GER), Marek Maliszewski (POL)

=== Classification games for 5th – 8th place ===
Semi-finals
20 July 2013
Turkey	70
Lithuania	68
20 July 2013
Montenegro	52
Greece	67

Fifth place
21 July 2013
Turkey	60
Greece	74
Seventh place
21 July 2013
Lithuania	84
Montenegro	51

20 July 2013
13:30

Report

Montenegro	52–67	Greece
Scoring by quarter: 10–26, 16–11, 12–19, 14–11
Pts: Nikolić, Vušović 10; Rebs: Miković, Pavić 6 Asts: Žižić 2		Pts: Papapetrou 18; Rebs: Antetokounmpo 9 Asts: Bochoridis, Antetokounmpo 3

Saku Suurhall, Tallinn
Attendance: 150
Referees: Juris Kokainis (LAT), Omer Esteron (ISR), Damian James Lyons (AUS)

20 July 2013
15:45

Report

Turkey	70–68	Lithuania
Scoring by quarter: 18–12, 20–18, 15–20, 17–18
Pts: Eroğlu 14; Rebs: Geyik 9 Asts: Geyik 6		Pts: Vaitkus 13; Rebs: Chatkevičius 8 Asts: Kariniauskas 4

Saku Suurhall, Tallinn
Attendance: 750
Referees: Jesed Diaz Bloncourt (PUR), Sigmundur Herbertsson (ISL), Igor Mitrovski (MKD)

==== Match for 7th place ====
21 July 2013
13:30

Report

Lithuania	84–51	Montenegro
Scoring by quarter: 17–11, 22–9, 22–14, 23–17
Pts: Semaška 20; Rebs: Chatkevičius, Kačinas 8 Asts: Semaška 7		Pts: Pavić 19; Rebs: Nikolić 11; Asts: Vrbica 7

Saku Suurhall, Tallinn
Attendance: 300
Referees: Ersan Kartal (TUR), Tamás Benczur (HUN), Ciprian Stoica (ROU)

==== Match for 5th place ====
21 July 2013
15:45

Report

Turkey	60–74	Greece
Scoring by quarter: 13–12, 11–23, 21–17, 15–22
Pts: Çandan 17; Rebs: Çandan 7 Asts: Eroğlu 5		Pts: Papapetrou 21; Rebs: Bochoridis 11; Asts: Bochoridis 6

Saku Suurhall, Tallinn
Attendance: 500
Referees: Sergiy Chebyshev (UKR), Ognjen Jokić (MNE), Gintaras Vitkauskas (LTU)

=== Semifinals ===
20 July 2013
18:00

Report

Latvia	64–63	Spain
Scoring by quarter: 13–21, 22–15, 16–13, 13–14
Pts: Bērziņš 14; Rebs: Bērziņš 12; Asts: Jakovics 4		Pts: Fernández 17; Rebs: Diez 15; Asts: Vives, Fernández 3

Saku Suurhall, Tallinn
Attendance: 3,000
Referees: Piotr Pastusiak (POL), Gintaras Vitkauskas (LTU), Ognjen Jokić (MNE)

20 July 2013
20:15

Report

Russia	68–77	Italy
Scoring by quarter: 16–18, 18–22, 15–15, 19–22
Pts: Zakharov 19; Rebs: Loginov 10; Asts: Zakharov 3		Pts: Abass 18; Rebs: Imbrò 8 Asts: Imbrò, Tonut 4

Saku Suurhall, Tallinn
Attendance: 3,000
Referees: Miodrag Ličina (SRB), Sergiy Chebyshev (UKR), Ersan Kartal (TUR)

=== Bronze medal game ===
21 July 2013
18:00

Report

Russia	63–70	Spain
Scoring by quarter: 17–23, 11–14, 11–15, 24–18
Pts: Gudumak 20; Rebs: Gudumak, Zakharov 10; Asts: Komolov 3		Pts: Diez 19; Rebs: Saiz 13; Asts: Fernández, Vives 4

Saku Suurhall, Tallinn
Attendance: 4,000
Referees: Alessandro Martolini (ITA), Juris Kokainis (LAT), Petr Hrusa (CZE)

=== Final ===
21 July 2013
20:15

Report

Italy	67–60	Latvia
Scoring by quarter: 9–13, 14–18, 23–11, 21–18
Pts: Della Valle 19; Rebs: Landi 8 Asts: Ruzzier 3		Pts: Bērziņš 26; Rebs: Bērziņš 15; Asts: Jakovičs 5

Saku Suurhall, Tallinn
Attendance: 6,800
Referees: Petar Obradović (BIH), Miguel Anguel Perez Niz (ESP), Paulo Marques (POR)

== Final standings ==
Rank	Team
1st place, gold medalist(s)	Italy
2nd place, silver medalist(s)	Latvia
3rd place, bronze medalist(s)	Spain
4th	Russia
5th	Greece
6th	Turkey
7th	Lithuania
8th	Montenegro
9th	France
10th	Slovenia
11th	Germany
12th	Croatia
13th	Serbia
14th	Bulgaria
15th	Israel
16th	Sweden
17th	Czech Republic
18th	Ukraine
19th	Estonia
20th	Georgia

2013 FIBA Europe Under-20 Championship winners

Italy
Second title

Team relegated to 2014 Division B

== Awards ==
Most Valuable Player

- (Italy) Amedeo Della Valle

All-Tournament Team

- (Latvia) Kaspars Vecvagars
- (Italy) Amedeo Della Valle
- (Italy) Awudu Abass
- (Spain) Daniel Díez
- (Latvia) Jānis Bērziņš
