= Zakharov (rural locality) =

Zakharov (Russian: Заха́ров; masculine) or Zakharova (Заха́рова; feminine or masculine genitive) is the name of several rural localities in Russia:

- Zakharov, Krasnodar Krai, a khutor in Tverskoy Rural Okrug of Apsheronsky District of Krasnodar Krai
- Zakharov, Chernyshkovsky District, Volgograd Oblast, a khutor in Zakharovsky Selsoviet of Chernyshkovsky District of Volgograd Oblast
- Zakharov, Kletsky District, Volgograd Oblast, a khutor in Zakharovsky Selsoviet of Kletsky District of Volgograd Oblast
- Zakharov, Kotelnikovsky District, Volgograd Oblast, a khutor in Zakharovsky Selsoviet of Kotelnikovsky District of Volgograd Oblast
- Zakharova, Arkhangelsk Oblast, a village in Kenozersky Selsoviet of Plesetsky District of Arkhangelsk Oblast
- Zakharova, Irkutsk Oblast, a village in Zhigalovsky District of Irkutsk Oblast
- Zakharova, Perm Krai, a village in Kudymkarsky District of Perm Krai
- Zakharova, Baykalovsky District, Sverdlovsk Oblast, a village in Baykalovsky District of Sverdlovsk Oblast
- Zakharova, Verkhotursky District, Sverdlovsk Oblast, a village in Verkhotursky District of Sverdlovsk Oblast

Alternative names

- Zakharova, alternative name of Zakharovo, a selo in Bezrukavsky Selsoviet of Rubtsovsky District in Altai Krai; 51°39′N 81°20′E
- Zakharova, alternative name of Zakharovo, a selo in Dumchevsky Selsoviet of Zalesovsky District in Altai Krai; 53°58′N 84°25′E
