= Zakharov =

Zakharov (Russian: Захаров), or Zakharova (feminine; Захарова) is a Russian surname. Notable people with the surname include:

== People ==
- Aleksandr Zakharov, multiple people
- Alexander V. Zakharov (born 1941), Soviet and Russian scientist
- Anastasia Zakharova (born 2002), Russian tennis player
- Andreyan Zakharov (1761–1811), Russian architect
- Andrey Zakharov, Russian journalist
- Artem Zakharov (disambiguation)
- Fyodor Zakharov (1919–1994), Russian and Ukrainian painter
- Gennadi Zakharov, Soviet physicist and spy
- Georgy Zakharov (army general) (1897–1957), Soviet military leader and army general
- Halyna Zakharova (born 1947), Soviet handball player
- Ivan Zakharov (1816–1885), Russian Sinologist
- Konstantin Zakharov (ice hockey) (born 1985), Belarusian ice hockey player
- Konstantin Zakharov (politician) (born 1973), Russian politician
- Maria Zakharova, (born 1975), Russian diplomat and journalist
- Maria Zakharova (figure skater) (born 2007), Russian figure skater
- Mark Zakharov (1933–2019), Russian film and theatre director and playwright
- Matvei Zakharov (1898–1972), Soviet military leader
- Mikhail Zakharov (Soviet Navy officer) (1912–1978), Soviet naval officer
- Nadezhda Zakharova (born 1945), Soviet basketball player
- Natalya Zakharova (born 1945), Russian rowing coxswain
- Olive Zakharov (1929–1995), Australian politician
- Pyotr Zakharov-Chechenets (1816–1846), Russian painter of Chechen origin
- Rostislav Zakharov (1907–1984), Soviet choreographer and People's Artist of the USSR
- Sergei Zakharov (disambiguation), multiple people
- Stella Zakharova (born 1963), Soviet gymnast
- Svetlana Zakharova (athlete) (born 1970), Russian runner
- Svetlana Zakharova (dancer) (born 1979), Russian dancer
- Tatjana Michaylovna Zacharova (born 1931), Russian production worker, author and politician
- Tetiana Zakharova-Nadyrova (born 1951), Soviet basketball player
- Vadim Petrovich Zakharov (born 1975), Russian scientist-chemist
- Vasily Zakharov (1934–2023), Soviet minister of culture
- Vera Zakharova (1920–2010), Soviet military pilot
- Vladimir E. Zakharov (1939–2023), Russian theoretical physicist
- Vladimir Ivanovich Zakharov (born 1961), Belarusian guitarist, composer and music teacher
- Vladimir Grigoryevich Zakharov (1901–1956), Soviet composer
- Vladimir Mikhailovich Zakharov (1946–2013) Russian choreographer, dancer and academician
- Yevgen Zakharov (born 1952), Ukrainian human rights activist
- Yury Zakharov (born 1938), Russian chemist and former rector of Rector of Kemerovo State University

== Fictional characters ==
- Prokhor Zakharov, fictional character profile from the video game Sid Meier's Alpha Centauri

== See also ==
- Zakharov (rural locality) (Zakharova), several rural localities in Russia
- Zakharovo, several rural localities in Russia
- Zakharovite, a mineral
- Sakharov, Russian surname
- Zakharov v. Russia, 2015 European Court for Human Rights ruling on surveillance legislation
