= Sakharov =

Sakharov (feminine: Sakharova) (Russian: Сахаров, Сахарова) is a Russian surname, derived from the word "сахар" (sugar). Other spellings of the surname are Saharov / Saharova, Sakharoff, Saharoff.

The surname may refer to:

== Saharov ==
- Aleksander Saharov (born 1982), Estonian professional footballer

== Sakharof ==
- Berry Sakharof (born 1957), Israeli rock guitarist, songwriter and singer

== Sakharoff ==
- Alexander Sakharoff (1886–1963), Russian dancer, teacher, and choreographer

== Sakharov ==
- Alik Sakharov (born 1959), American television director.
- Andrei Sakharov (1921–1989), Russian physicist and anti-Soviet dissident
- Andrey Sakharov (historian) (1930–2019), Russian historian
- Anton Sakharov (born 1982), Russian footballer
- Gleb Sakharov (born 1988), Uzbek–French tennis player
- Nikita Sakharov (1915–1945), Soviet Evenk writer
- Sophrony (Sakharov) (1896–1993), Christian monk, mystic and teacher
- Vladimir Sakharov (footballer) (born 1948), former Soviet footballer
- Vladimir Viktorovich Sakharov (1853–1920), general of the Russian Imperial Army
- Vladimir Vladimirovich Sakharov (1902–1969), Soviet geneticist
- Yuri Sakharov (1922–1981), Ukrainian chess master

== Sakharova ==
- Julia Sakharova, Russian violinist
- Tatiana Sakharova (1973–2025), Russian politician

== Other ==
- 1979 Sakharov, a main-belt asteroid named for Andrei Sakharov
- Sakharov (film), a 1984 TV film starring Jason Robards as Andrei Sakharov

== See also ==
- Sakharov Prize
- Zakharov (Russian: Захаров)
