= Laimonas =

Laimonas is a Lithuanian masculine given name. Notable people with the name include:

- Laimonas Chatkevičius (born 1993), Lithuanian basketball player
- Laimonas Kisielius (born 1985), Lithuanian basketball player
