= Erbil (disambiguation) =

Erbil may refer to:

- Erbil, a city in the Kurdistan Region, Iraq
- Erbil Governorate, Kurdistan Region, Iraq

== Given name ==
- Erbil Eroğlu (born 1993), Turkish basketball player

== Surnames ==
- Mehmet Ali Erbil (born 1957), Turkish comedian, actor and talk show host
