= Pavlin Ivanov =

Bulgarian basketball player (born 1993)

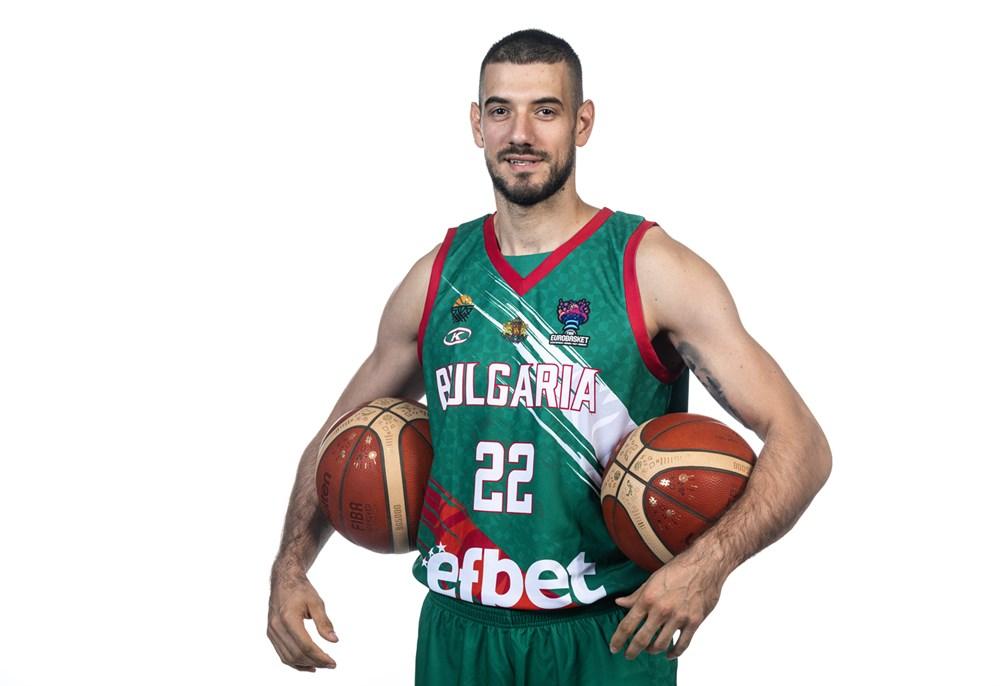

No. 10 – Balkan Botevgrad
- Position: Shooting guard
- League: NBL; EuroCup

Personal information
- Born: March 28, 1993 (age 33) Yambol, Bulgaria
- Listed height: 6 ft 5 in (1.96 m)
- Listed weight: 198 lb (90 kg)

Career information
- Playing career: 2011–present

Career history
- 2011–2012: Benetton Treviso
- 2012–2013: Budućnost
- 2013–2014: Yambol
- 2014–2015: Levski Sofia
- 2015: Beroe
- 2015–2017: Academic
- 2018: Levski Sofia
- 2018-2019: Balkan Botevgrad
- 2019–2020: Blu Basket Treviglio
- 2020: Beroe
- 2020–2022: Rilski Sportist
- 2022–2023: Balkan Botevgrad
- 2023–2024: CSU Sibiu
- 2024–2025: CB Menorca
- 2025: New Taipei CTBC DEA
- 2026: Spartak Pleven
- 2026–present: Balkan Botevgrad

Career highlights
- 4x NBL champion (2016, 2017, 2018, 2023); NBL Finals MVP (2016); 2x Bulgarian Basketball Cup champion (2021, 2022); Bulgarian Basketball Cup MVP (2022)

Pavlin Ivanov (Bulgarian: Павлин Иванов; born March 28, 1993) is a Bulgarian professional basketball player who plays for Balkan Botevgrad of the Bulgarian National Basketball League (NBL) and the EuroCup. He plays as a shooting guard.

== Career ==
Ivanov started playing basketball at the local youth club in Yambol - Tiger, at the age of nine. In 2008 he moved to Benetton Basket youth club and made his professional debut there in the season 2011–12. The next season, he signed for KK Budućnost. In December 2013 he returned to his home town to play for BC Yambol. In 2014–15 he signed for Levski, but he finished the season at BC Beroe. The next season Ivanov moved to Lukoil Academic. His club won the League and he was awarded finals MVP. In the first days of 2018 he moved to Levski Lukoil with all the first team players of Lukoil Academic, as part of a sponsorship switch between the two clubs. He signed with Balkan for 1+1 years, in November 2018.

On February 2, 2020, he has signed with Beroe in the Bulgarian NBL. The same year in June he joined Rilski Sportist.

After two seasons with Rilski Sportist, Ivanov moved for a second time to defending champion that year Balkan Botevgrad. The next season, he signed with CSU Sibiu of the Romanian league. In August 2024 he signed in Spain for CB Menorca of the Primera FEB for the 24–25 season.

On August 25, 2025, Ivanov signed with the New Taipei CTBC DEA of the Taiwan Professional Basketball League (TPBL).

On January 12, 2026, the New Taipei CTBC DEA terminated the contract relationship with Ivanov. On the same day, Spartak Pleven announced that he will join the team.

Before the start of 2026–27 season, Ivanov was signed by the EuroCup debutant Balkan.

== Bulgarian national team ==
Ivanov represented the senior men's Bulgarian national team in the EuroBasket 2022, averaging 10.2 points per game. His first men's game was against Romania. With Bulgaria's youth national teams, he played at the 2010 FIBA Europe Under-18 Championship and 2013 FIBA Europe Under-20 Championship.
