= Juknevičius =

Juknevičius is a Lithuanian surname. Notable people with the surname include:

- Antanas Juknevičius (born 1974), Lithuanian racing driver
- Rytis Juknevičius (born 1993), Lithuanian basketball player
- Zenonas Juknevičius (1949–2026), Lithuanian lawyer and politician
