= Ingus Jakovičs =

Latvian basketball player (born 1993)

No. 8 – Palencia Baloncesto
- Position: Point guard
- League: Primera FEB

Personal information
- Born: 18 April 1993 (age 33) Madona, Latvia
- Listed height: 1.86 m (6 ft 1 in)
- Listed weight: 77 kg (170 lb)

Career information
- Playing career: 2009–present

Career history
- 2009–2010: BK Gulbenes Buki
- 2010–2011: BAA Rīga
- 2011–2014: BK Liepājas Lauvas
- 2014–2016: VEF Rīga
- 2016: Nizhny Novgorod
- 2016–2019: Ventspils
- 2019–2021: Varese
- 2021: Budivelnyk
- 2021–2022: Valmiera Glass ViA
- 2022: CSP Limoges
- 2023–2025: Básquet Coruña
- 2025–present: Palencia Baloncesto

Career highlights
- LBL champion (2015)
Medals
Men's basketball
Representing Latvia
FIBA Europe Under-20 Championship
Silver medal – second place	2013 Estonia	National Team

Ingus Jakovičs (born 18 April 1993) is a Latvian professional basketball player who last played for Palencia Baloncesto of the Primera FEB. He is also a member of the Latvian national team.

== Professional career ==
Jakovičs started playing basketball for BK Gulbenes Buki in Latvian Basketball League 2nd division. In 2010, he spent a season with BAA Riga, which was a youth team that played in LBL D2. A year later he moved to BK Liepājas Lauvas where he played until the end of the 2013 when his contract was bought out by VEF Rīga.

On 3 January 2014 he signed with VEF Rīga until the end of 2015–16 season.

On 5 August 2019 he signed with Pallacanestro Varese of the Lega Basket Serie A.

At the end of February 2021, Jakovičs received a more appealing offer from Budivelnyk, and on 25 February 2021 he signed and moved to Kyiv. On 30 November 2021 Jakovičs signed with Valmiera Glass ViA of the LEBL.

On 1 February 2022 he signed with CSP Limoges of the LNB Pro A.

== International career ==
In July 2013, Jakovičs helped the Latvian U20 team to reach the U20 European Championship finals. During this tournament he averaged 13.6 points, 3.5 assists and 2.5 rebounds. On 14 July 2014 he made his debut for the senior Latvian National Team in a win over Estonia.
