= Zakharova, Perm Krai =

Zakharova Захарова
- Village
- Location within Perm Krai Location within Russia
- Coordinates: 59°14′N 54°38′E
- Country: Russia
- Region: Perm Krai
- District: Kudymkarsky District

Population (2010)
  - Total: 47
- Time zone: UTC+5:00

Zakharova (Russian: Захарова) is a rural locality (a village) in Oshibskoye Rural Settlement, Kudymkarsky District, Perm Krai, Russia. The population was 47 as of 2010.

== History ==
In 1893, a wooden church, Apostle James the Brother of the Lord, was built in the village by architect A.B. Turevich, and was initlally designated as the church for nearby Oshib. The church was closed in 1936.

== Demographics ==
The village had a population of 334 people in 1963, and was part of the Trapeznikovsky village council. The population total fell to 47 people by 2010.

== Geography ==
Zakharova is located 39 km north of Kudymkar (the district's administrative centre) by road. Yegorova is the nearest rural locality.
