= Aleksandr Zakharov =

Aleksandr Zakharov may refer to:

- Alexander V. Zakharov (born 1941), Russian scientist
- Aleksandr Zakharov (water polo) (born 1954), Soviet water polo player
- Oleksandr Zakharov (born 1966), Soviet and Ukrainian professional footballer
- Aleksandr Zakharov (footballer, born 1969), Soviet Russian football midfielder
- Aleksandr Zakharov (footballer, born 1987), Russian football forward
- Alexander Zakharov (basketball) (born 1993), Russian basketball player
