= Hugo Invernizzi =

French basketball player

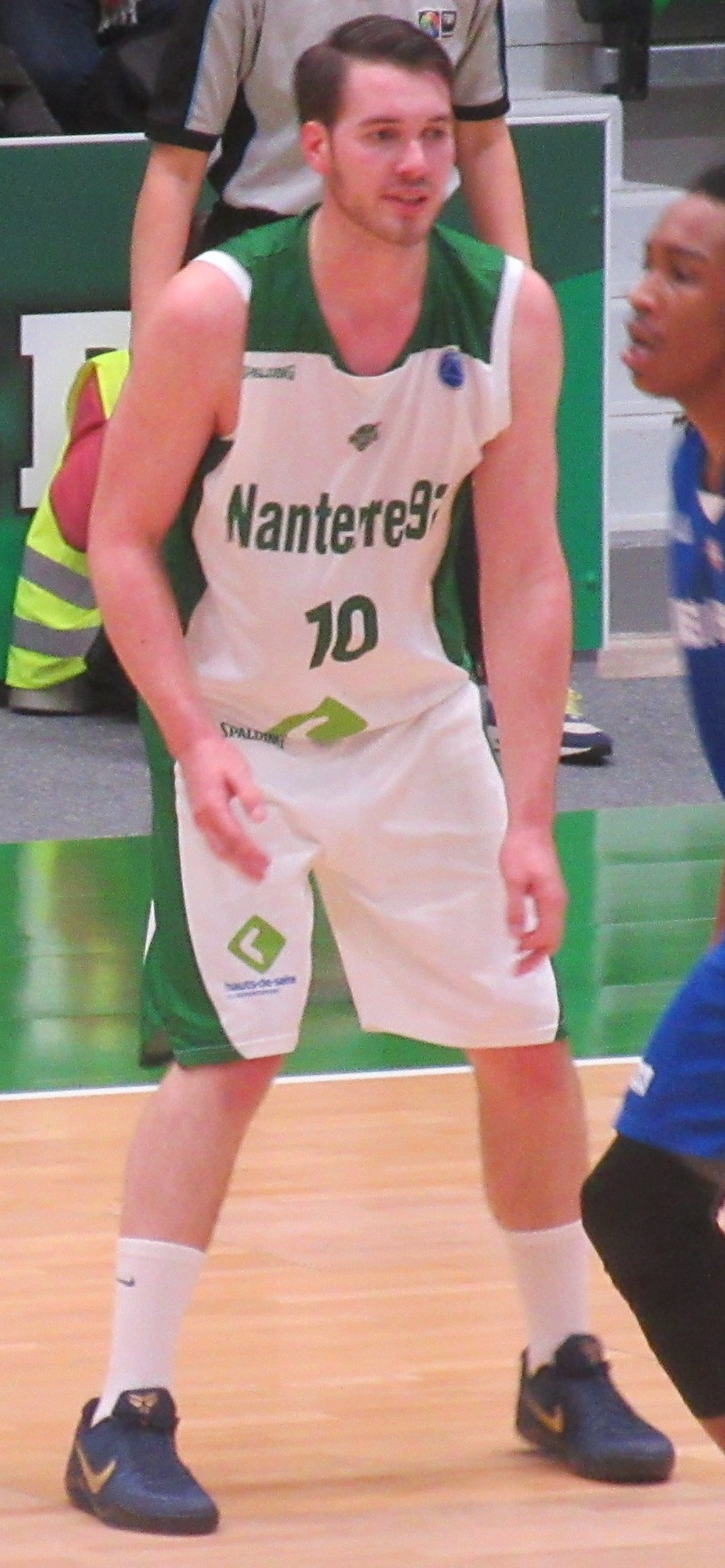

No. 14 – Limoges CSP
- Position: Small forward
- League: LNB Pro A

Personal information
- Born: January 7, 1993 (age 32) Mulhouse, France
- Listed height: 1.96 m (6 ft 5 in)
- Listed weight: 95 kg (209 lb)

Career information
- Playing career: 2011–present

Career history
- 2011–2013: Strasbourg IG
- 2013–2015: STB Le Havre
- 2015–2019: Nanterre 92
- 2019–2022: Limoges CSP
- 2022–2023: BC Wolves
- 2023: Universo Treviso Basket
- 2023–2025: SIG Strasbourg
- 2025–present: Limoges CSP

Career highlights
- FIBA Europe Cup champion (2017); French Cup champion (2017); Next Generation Tournament champion (2010)

Hugo Invernizzi (born January 7, 1993) is a French professional basketball player for Limoges CSP of the LNB Pro A. He stands 196 cm (6’5’’) tall and plays small forward position.

== Professional career ==
Born in Mulhouse, Alsace, Invernizzi attended INSEP, the French National Institute of Sport, expertise, and performance, from 2008 to 2011.

Invernizzi signed his first professional contract with Strasbourg IG in 2011 and made his debut in the French top-flight Pro A during the 2011–12 season.

In 2013, Invernizzi joined STB Le Havre. During his first season in Normandy, he won the 3 points shootout contest of the LNB All-Star Game.

In 2015, Invernizzi joined Nanterre 92. In April 2017, he won the 2016–17 French Basketball Cup, his first title.

On July 23, 2019, he has signed with Limoges CSP of the LNB Pro A. He averaged 10.4 points, 2 assists and 3.6 rebounds per game in the 2019–20 season. On May 31, 2020, he signed an extension with the team until 2022.

On August 10, 2022, he has signed with BC Wolves of the Lithuanian Basketball League.

On January 26, 2023, he signed with Universo Treviso Basket of the LBA.

On July 5, 2023, he signed with SIG Strasbourg of the French LNB Pro A.

On September 15, 2025, he signed with Limoges CSP of the LNB Pro A.

== National team ==
Invernizzi played in the 2013 FIBA Europe Under-20 Championship in Estonia, averaging 12.7 points, 3.8 rebounds and 3.1 assists a game.

In 2014, 2015 and 2016, he belonged to the France A' team who participated in tournaments in China.

He made his debuts with France national basketball team on June 16, 2016 against Latvia at Palais des Sports de Pau;
