= Sergei Zakharov =

Sergei Zakharov may refer to:

- Sergei Yefimovich Zakharov (1900–1993), painter
- Sergei Georgievich Zakharov (1950–2019), lounge singer
- Sergei Aleksandrovich Zakharov (born 1984), footballer
