= Zakharovo, Belgorod Oblast =

Zakharovo Захарово
- Selo
- Location within Belgorod Oblast Location within Russia
- Coordinates: 50°59′N 37°42′E
- Country: Russia
- Region: Belgorod Oblast
- District: Chernyansky District
- Time zone: UTC+3:00

Zakharovo (Russian: Захарово) is a rural locality (a selo) in Chernyansky District, Belgorod Oblast, Russia. The population was 281 as of 2010. There are 4 streets.

== Geography ==
Zakharovo is located 15 km northwest of Chernyanka (the district's administrative centre) by road. Olshanka is the nearest rural locality.
