= Miha Lapornik =

Slovenian basketball player (born 1993)

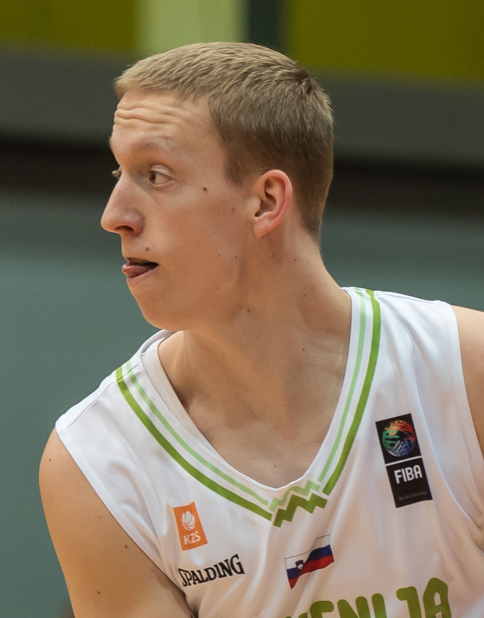
- Lapornik with Slovenia in 2016

No. 31 – CD Estela
- Position: Shooting guard
- League: Primera FEB

Personal information
- Born: 18 October 1993 (age 33) Celje, Slovenia
- Listed height: 1.92 m (6 ft 4 in)

Career information
- NBA draft: 2015: undrafted
- Playing career: 2010–present

Career history
- 2010–2015: Zlatorog Laško
- 2015–2016: Olimpija
- 2016–2017: Bilbao Basket
- 2017: Zlatorog Laško
- 2018: U-BT Cluj-Napoca
- 2018–2019: Olimpija
- 2019–2020: Pieno žvaigždės
- 2020–2021: Heroes Den Bosch
- 2021: DEAC
- 2022: Zlatorog Laško
- 2022: Krka
- 2022–2023: Patrioti Levice
- 2023–2025: San Pablo Burgos
- 2025–2026: Twarde Pierniki Toruń
- 2026–present: CD Estela

Career highlights
- FIBA Europe Cup Top Scorer (2023); All-DBL Team (2021); Romanian Cup winner (2018)

Miha Lapornik (born 18 October 1993) is a Slovenian professional basketball player for CD Estela of the Primera FEB. He is a 1.92 m (6 ft 3 1/2 in) tall shooting guard.

== Professional career ==
Lapornik started playing professional basketball for Zlatorog Laško.

On 27 July 2015, Lapornik signed a three-year contract with Union Olimpija.

In July 2016, he parted ways with Union Olimpija and signed a one-year contract with an option to extend it for one more year with Spanish team Bilbao Basket .

In October 2017, he signed an open contract with Zlatorog Laško.

In January 2018, Lapornik signed with U-Banca Transilvania Cluj-Napoca out of Romania.

On 26 June 2018, he signed a contract with Petrol Olimpija.

He spent the 2019–20 season with Pieno žvaigždės in Lithuania, averaging 13.3 points per game.

On 25 July 2020, Lapornik signed with Heroes Den Bosch until 2022. He was named to the All-DBL Team for the 2021–22 season.

On 5 July 2021, Heroes announced Lapornik had signed with DEAC in Hungary. He was offered a better contract, allowing him to leave early out of his contract.

After a brief spell with Zlatorog in January 2022, where he stayed for only nine days and played one match, Lapornik joined the ABA League team Krka on 14 January 2022.

In summer 2022, he signed with Patrioti Levice of the Slovak Basketball League.

On July 13, 2025, he signed with Twarde Pierniki Toruń of the Polish Basketball League (PLK).

In January 2026, he signed for CD Estela of the Primera FEB.

== International career ==
Lapornik made his debut for the Slovenian national team on 31 August 2016, in the EuroBasket 2017 qualification game against Kosovo.
