= Zakharovo, Kichmengsko-Gorodetsky District, Vologda Oblast =

Zakharovo Захарово
- Village
- Location within Vologda Oblast Location within Russia
- Coordinates: 60°03′N 45°37′E
- Country: Russia
- Region: Vologda Oblast
- District: Kichmengsko-Gorodetsky District
- Time zone: UTC+3:00

Zakharovo (Russian: Захарово) is a rural locality (a village) in Gorodetskoye Rural Settlement, Kichmengsko-Gorodetsky District, Vologda Oblast, Russia. The population was 28 as of 2002.

== Geography ==
Zakharovo is located 19 km northwest of Kichmengsky Gorodok (the district's administrative centre) by road. Glebovo is the nearest rural locality.
