= Vladimir Vladimirovich Sakharov =

Vladimir Vladimirovich Sakharov (28 February 1902 – 9 January 1969) was a Soviet cytogeneticist who studied mutagenesis by radiation with applications to agricultural and human genetics. He was a professor at the K. A. Timiriazev Agricultural Academy.

Sakharov was born Simbirsk to agronomist Vladimir and teacher Maria Antonovna Ponyatovskaya, daughter of a Moscow physician. The family moved to Moscow in 1919 and Sakharov went to the Moscow State University in 1920 and graduated in 1926 after working at the Institute of Experimental Biology with a dissertation on “Novaya mutatsia u drozofily” (“New Mutation in Drosophila”) and “Razbor muzykalnykh genealogy” (“Analysis of Musical Genealogies”). He then taught at a Moscow school before joining the IEB in 1927 to research under Nikolai Koltsov. He then moved to work at the Moscow Pharmaceutical Institute and then directed the Institute of General Genetics. He became a professor at the K. A. Timiriazev Moscow Agricultural Academy in 1965, working there until his death.

Sakharov worked on the heredity of goitre among people in Uzbekistan, examined chemical mutagenesis and created polyploid plants including varieties of buckwheat using colchicine.
