= Zakharovo, Muromsky District, Vladimir Oblast =

Zakharovo Захарово
- Village
- Location within Vladimir Oblast Location within Russia
- Coordinates: 55°50′N 42°25′E
- Country: Russia
- Region: Vladimir Oblast
- District: Muromsky District
- Time zone: UTC+3:00

Zakharovo (Russian: Захарово) is a rural locality (a village) in Borisoglebskoye Rural Settlement, Muromsky District, Vladimir Oblast, Russia. The population was 10 as of 2010. There are 2 streets.

== Geography ==
Zakharovo is located 59 km northeast of Murom (the district's administrative centre) by road. Poleskovo is the nearest rural locality.
