= Zakharovo, Sudogodsky District, Vladimir Oblast =

Zakharovo Захарово
- Village
- Location within Vladimir Oblast Location within Russia
- Coordinates: 56°00′N 40°33′E
- Country: Russia
- Region: Vladimir Oblast
- District: Sudogodsky District
- Time zone: UTC+3:00

Zakharovo (Russian: Захарово) is a rural locality (a village) in Golovinskoye Rural Settlement, Sudogodsky District, Vladimir Oblast, Russia. The population was 74 as of 2010.

== Geography ==
Zakharovo is located 27 km northwest of Sudogda (the district's administrative centre) by road. Yefimovskaya is the nearest rural locality.
