= Tom Maayan =

Israeli basketball player

Tom Maayan תום מעיין
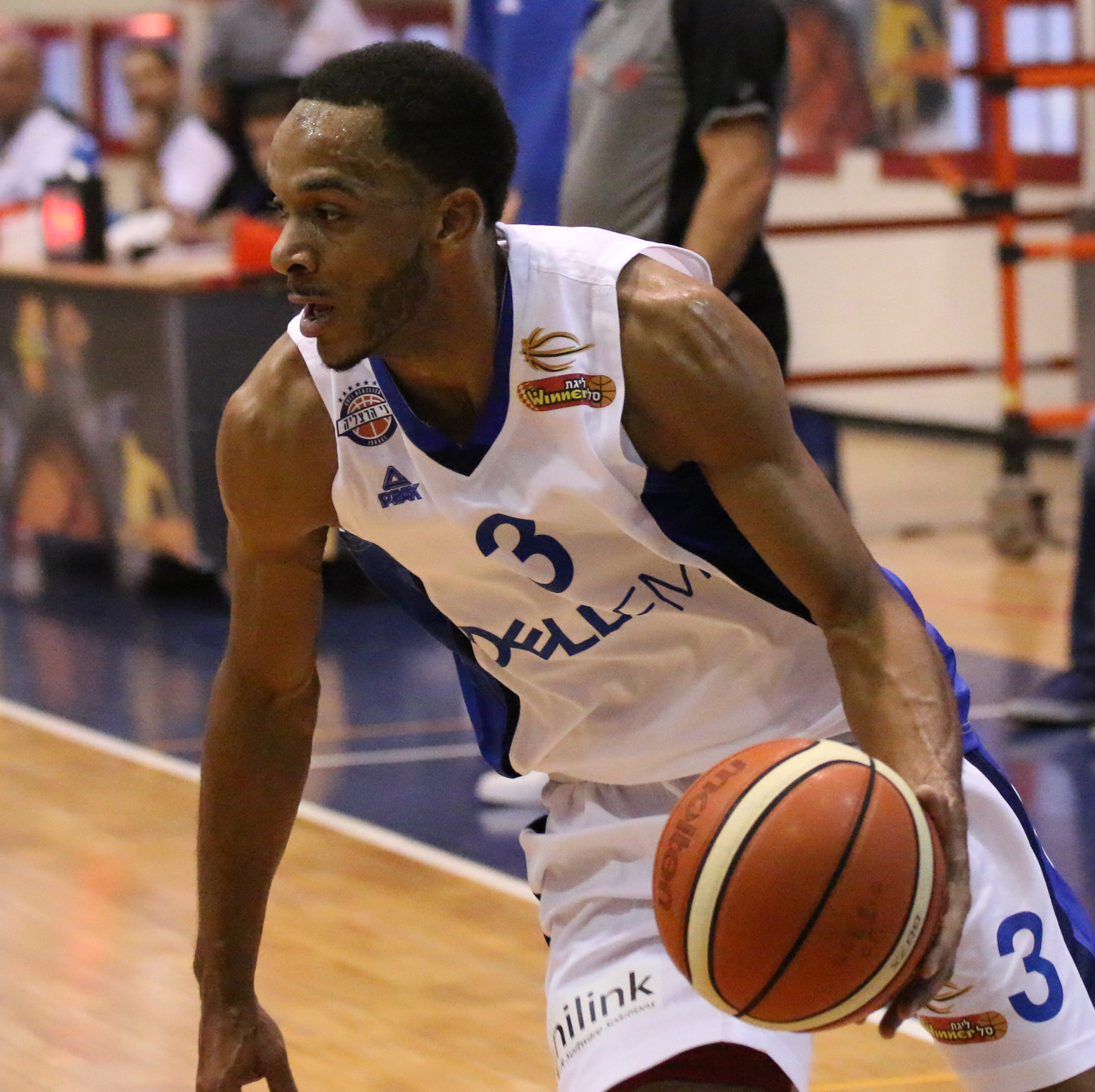
- Maayan playing for Herzliya in October 2016

Free Agent
- Position: Point guard / shooting guard

Personal information
- Born: July 5, 1993 (age 33) Montreal, Quebec, Canada
- Listed height: 1.88 m (6 ft 2 in)
- Listed weight: 79 kg (174 lb)

Career information
- High school: Emek Hahula (Israel)
- College: Seton Hall (2012–2013)
- NBA draft: 2016: undrafted
- Playing career: 2013–present

Career history
- 2013–2015: Hapoel Jerusalem
- 2014–2015: →Elitzur Ramla
- 2015–2018: Bnei Herzliya
- 2018–2019: Maccabi Ashdod
- 2019: Maccabi Haifa
- 2019–2020: Maccabi Kiryat Motzkin
- 2020–2021: Hapoel Be'er Sheva
- 2021–2022: Hapoel Gilboa Galil

Career highlights
- Israeli Premier League champion (2015); Israeli National League champion (2019)

Tom Kenji Maayan (Hebrew: תום מעיין; born July 5, 1993) is an Israeli professional basketball player who last played for Hapoel Gilboa Galil of the Israeli Basketball Premier League. He played college basketball for Seton Hall University before playing professionally in Israel. Maayan, A 1.88 m (6 ft 2 in) tall combo guard, is primarily known for his defensive skills.

== Early life and college career ==
Maayan was born in Montreal, Quebec, he lived his first 3 years in Canada before settling in Kfar HaNassi, Israel. Maayan played for Hapoel Galil Elyon youth team, he also played for Emek Hahula High School team and led them to win the state championship in 2011.

On August 25, 2011, prior to college, Maayan joined the Canarias Basketball Academy based in the Canary Islands, Spain.

Maayan played college basketball for Seton Hall University's Pirates. In his sophomore year at Seton Hall, he averaged 2.4 points and 2.7 assists per game in 10 games played for the Pirates.

On November 19, 2013, Maayan was required to return to Israel for army service and his college career ended.

== Professional career ==
On December 18, 2013, Maayan started his professional career with Hapoel Jerusalem, signing a five-year contract. On January 5, 2014, he made his professional debut in match against Bnei Herzliya.

On November 13, 2014, Maayan was loaned to Elitzur Ramla of the Israeli National League as part of a two-way contract.

On August 6, 2015, Maayan parted ways with Jerusalem and signed a two-year deal with Bnei Herzliya

On February 8, 2017, Maayan signed a two-year contract extension with Herzliya. On March 12, 2018, Maayan recorded a career-high 18 points, scoring 14 points in the third quarter and led Herzliya to a 94–83 win over Hapoel Gilboa Galil.

On July 25, 2018, Maayan signed with Maccabi Ashdod for the 2018–19 season. However, on March 5, 2019, Maayan parted ways with Ashdod to join Maccabi Haifa for the rest of the season. Maayan went on to win the 2019 Israeli National League championship with Haifa.

On July 16, 2019, Maayan signed with Maccabi Kiryat Motzkin for the 2019–20 season.

On September 9, 2021, Maayan signed with Hapoel Gilboa Galil of the Israeli Basketball Premier League.

== National team career ==
Maayan was a member of the Israeli U-18 and U-20 national teams. He also participated at the 2010 Summer Youth Olympics.
