= Zakharovo, Kirzhachsky District, Vladimir Oblast =

Zakharovo Захарово
- Village
- Location within Vladimir Oblast Location within Russia
- Coordinates: 56°05′37″N 38°33′12″E
- Country: Russia
- Region: Vladimir Oblast
- District: Kirzhachsky District
- Time zone: UTC+3:00

Zakharovo (Russian: Захарово) is a rural locality (a village) in Filippovskoye Rural Settlement, Kirzhachsky District, Vladimir Oblast, Russia. The population was 10 as of 2010.

== Geography ==
Zakharovo is located on the Melyozha River, 24 km west from Kirzhach (the district's administrative centre) by road. Rozhkovo is the nearest rural locality.
