= Oshib =

Oshib Ошиб
- Selo
- Location within Perm Krai Location within Russia
- Coordinates: 59°13′N 54°52′E
- Country: Russia
- Region: Perm Krai
- District: Kudymkarsky District
- Time zone: UTC+5:00

Oshib (Russian: Ошиб) is a rural locality (a selo) and the administrative center of Oshibskoye Rural Settlement, Kudymkarsky District, Perm Krai, Russia. The population was 536 as of 2010. There are 26 streets.

== Geography ==
Oshib is located 31 km northeast of Kudymkar (the district's administrative centre) by road. Rocheva is the nearest rural locality.
