= Zakharovo, Gryazovetsky District, Vologda Oblast =

Zakharovo Захарово
- Village
- Location within Vologda Oblast Location within Russia
- Coordinates: 58°56′N 39°41′E
- Country: Russia
- Region: Vologda Oblast
- District: Gryazovetsky District
- Time zone: UTC+3:00

Zakharovo (Russian: Захарово) is a rural locality (a village) in Yurovskoye Rural Settlement, Gryazovetsky District, Vologda Oblast, Russia. The population was 11 as of 2002.

== Geography ==
Zakharovo is located 42 km northwest of Gryazovets (the district's administrative centre) by road. Isakovo is the nearest rural locality.
