= Zakharovo, Selivanovsky District, Vladimir Oblast =

Zakharovo Захарово
- Selo
- Location within Vladimir Oblast Location within Russia
- Coordinates: 55°40′N 41°36′E
- Country: Russia
- Region: Vladimir Oblast
- District: Selivanovsky District
- Time zone: UTC+3:00

Zakharovo (Russian: Захарово) is a rural locality (a selo) in Malyshevskoye Rural Settlement, Selivanovsky District, Vladimir Oblast, Russia. The population was 40 as of 2010.

== Geography ==
Zakharovo is located 37 km southwest of Krasnaya Gorbatka (the district's administrative centre) by road. Korelkino is the nearest rural locality.
