= Laimonas Chatkevičius =

Lithuanian basketball player (born 1993)

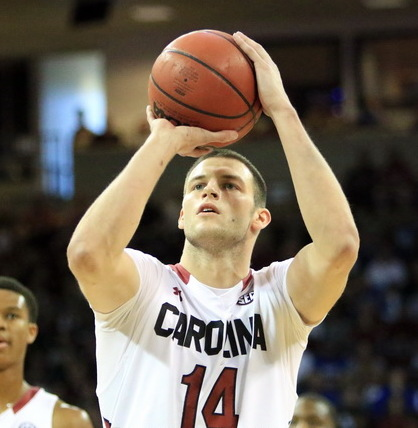

Personal information
- Born: January 7, 1993 (age 33) Klaipėda, Lithuania
- Listed height: 6 ft 11 in (2.11 m)
- Listed weight: 255 lb (116 kg)

Career information
- College: South Carolina (2012–2016)
- NBA draft: 2016: undrafted
- Playing career: 2016–2018
- Position: Center

Career history
- 2016–2017: MKS Dąbrowa Górnicza
- 2017–2018: AZS Koszalin
- 2018: Neptūnas Klaipėda

Laimonas Chatkevičius (born January 7, 1993) is a former professional Lithuanian basketball player who last played for Neptūnas Klaipėda of the Lithuanian Basketball League. He plays at the center position.

== Professional career ==
After graduating from the South Carolina Gamecocks, Chatkevičius signed a one-year deal with MKS Dąbrowa Górnicza. On 2017–18 season he signed with AZS Koszalin, but in February Chatkevičius come back to Lithuania, and signed with Neptūnas Klaipėda for the rest of the season.

== International career ==
Chatkevičius played in 2013 FIBA Europe Under-20 Championship for Lithuania men's national under-20 basketball team, averaging 7,9 points, 8,1 rebounds per game.
