= Zakharov, Kletsky District, Volgograd Oblast =

Zakharov Захаров
- Khutor
- Location within Volgograd Oblast Location within Russia
- Coordinates: 49°10′N 42°54′E
- Country: Russia
- Region: Volgograd Oblast
- District: Kletsky District
- Time zone: UTC+4:00

Zakharov (Russian: Захаров) is a rural locality (a khutor) and the administrative center of Zakharovskoye Rural Settlement, Kletsky District, Volgograd Oblast, Russia. The population was 623 as of 2010. There are 12 streets.

== Geography ==
Zakharov is located 24 km southwest of Kletskaya (the district's administrative centre) by road. Yevstratovsky is the nearest rural locality.
