= Sergei Zakharov (footballer) =

Russian footballer

Personal information
- Full name: Sergei Aleksandrovich Zakharov
- Date of birth: 9 December 1984 (age 41)
- Place of birth: Lipetsk, Russian SFSR
- Height: 1.74 m (5 ft 8 1/2 in)
- Position: Midfielder

Senior career*
Years	Team	Apps	(Gls)
2005	FC Metallurg-2 Lipetsk (D4)		
2006–2007	FC Metallurg Lipetsk	40	(2)
2008	FC Lukhovitsy	13	(1)
2008	FC Gornyak Uchaly	14	(0)
2009	FC Metallurg Lipetsk	7	(0)
2009	FC Gornyak Uchaly	5	(0)
2010–2011	FC Metallurg Lipetsk	42	(0)
2012	FC Sever Murmansk	15	(0)
2012–2013	FC Metallurg Lipetsk	10	(0)
- * Club domestic league appearances and goals

Sergei Aleksandrovich Zakharov (Russian: Серге́й Александрович Захаров; born 9 December 1984) is a former Russian professional football player.

== Club career ==
He made his Russian Football National League debut for FC Metallurg Lipetsk on 14 May 2009 in a game against FC Salyut-Energiya Belgorod.
