= Zakharovo, Gus-Khrustalny District, Vladimir Oblast =

Zakharovo Захарово
- Village
- Location within Vladimir Oblast Location within Russia
- Coordinates: 55°24′N 41°12′E
- Country: Russia
- Region: Vladimir Oblast
- District: Gus-Khrustalny District
- Time zone: UTC+3:00

Zakharovo (Russian: Захарово) is a rural locality (a village) in Posyolok Zolotkovo, Gus-Khrustalny District, Vladimir Oblast, Russia. The population was 25 as of 2010.

== Geography ==
Zakharovo is located on the Charmus River, 60 km southeast of Gus-Khrustalny (the district's administrative centre) by road. Obdikhovo is the nearest rural locality.
