= Zakharov, Kotelnikovsky District, Volgograd Oblast =

Zakharov Захаров
- Khutor
- Location within Volgograd Oblast Location within Russia
- Coordinates: 47°41′N 43°06′E
- Country: Russia
- Region: Volgograd Oblast
- District: Kotelnikovsky District
- Time zone: UTC+4:00

Zakharov (Russian: Захаров) is a rural locality (a khutor) and the administrative center of Zakharovskoye Rural Settlement, Kotelnikovsky District, Volgograd Oblast, Russia. The population was 489 as of 2010. There are 14 streets.

== Geography ==
Zakharov is located on the right bank of the Aksay Yesaulovsky, 8 km northwest of Kotelnikovo (the district's administrative centre) by road. Kotelnikovo is the nearest rural locality.
