= Mašan Vrbica =

Montenegrin basketball player

Academic Plovdiv
- Position: Point guard
- League: NBL

Personal information
- Born: 14 June 1994 (age 32) Cetinje, FR Yugoslavia
- Listed height: 1.87 m (6 ft 2 in)
- Listed weight: 74 kg (163 lb)

Career information
- Playing career: 2011–present

Career history
- 2011–2014: Lovćen
- 2014: Mega Vizura
- 2014–2016: →Teodo Tivat
- 2016–2017: Gorica
- 2017–2021: Lovćen
- 2021–2022: Spars
- 2022–2023: Sutjeska
- 2023–2024: Lovćen
- 2024: BK Patrioti Levice
- 2024–present: Academic Plovdiv
Medals
Men's basketball
Representing Montenegro
Games of the Small States of Europe
Silver medal – second place	2017 San Marino	National Team

Mašan Vrbica (born June 14, 1994) is a Montenegrin professional basketball player for Academic Plovdiv of the NBL

== Professional career ==
He made his professional debut with Lovćen during the 2011–12 season. In the summer of 2014, he signed a three-year contract with Mega Vizura. On December 17, 2014, he was loaned to Teodo Tivat for the rest of the season.
