= Jesper Eliasson =

Swedish ice hockey player (born 2000)

- Born: 21 March 2000 (age 26) Eksjö, Sweden
- Height: 6 ft 3 in (191 cm)
- Weight: 209 lb (95 kg; 14 st 13 lb)
- Position: Goaltender
- Shoots: Left
- Norway team Former teams: Stjernen Hockey; Växjö Lakers; EC Red Bull Salzburg
- NHL draft: 84th overall, 2018; Detroit Red Wings
- Playing career: 2019–present

Jesper Eliasson (born 21 March 2000) is a Swedish professional ice hockey goaltender currently playing for Stjernen Hockey of the Eliteserien (Norway). He was drafted 84th overall by the Detroit Red Wings in the 2018 NHL entry draft.

== Playing career ==
During the 2018–19 season, Eliasson played in 33 games in his first full season with the Växjö Lakers J20 in the J20 SuperElit. Eliasson registered a 2.43 goals-against average (GAA) for the Lakers, which ranked seventh in the league, and had a .919 save percentage, tied for fourth in the league.

Eliasson made his professional debut for the Växjö Lakers of the Swedish Hockey League (SHL) during the 2019–20 season, appearing in one game. On 6 June 2019, Eliasson was loaned from Växjö Lakers to Almtuna IS of HockeyAllsvenskan. During the 2019–20 season, Eliasson appeared in 25 games for Almtuna, where he posted a 7–18–0 record, with a 3.09 GAA, and .887 save percentage.

On 8 April 2020, Eliasson signed with Färjestad BK of the SHL. On 2 October 2020, Eliasson was loaned from Färjestad BK to EC Red Bull Salzburg of the ICEHL.

== International play ==
Medal record

Representing Sweden

Ice hockey

World U18 Championships
Bronze medal – third place	2018 Russia	

World Junior Championships
Bronze medal – third place	2020 Czech Republic	

Eliasson represented Sweden at the 2018 IIHF World U18 Championships where he appeared in one game, with a 3.00 GAA, .885 save percentage, and won a bronze medal. Eliasson represented Sweden at the 2020 World Junior Ice Hockey Championships where he appeared in one game, with a 2.00 GAA, .895 save percentage, and won a bronze medal.

== Career statistics ==
=== Regular season and playoffs ===
			Regular season									Playoffs
Season	Team	League	GP	W	L	OTL	MIN	GA	SO	GAA	SV%	GP	W	L	MIN	GA	SO	GAA	SV%
2018–19	Växjö Lakers	J20	33	19	11	0	1,855	75	2	2.43	.919	2	0	2	139	5	0	2.17	.933
2019–20	Växjö Lakers	J20	1	1	0	0	60	0	1	0.00	1.000	—	—	—	—	—	—	—	—
2019–20	Växjö Lakers	SHL	1	0	1	0	40	3	0	4.50	.857	—	—	—	—	—	—	—	—
2019–20	Almtuna IS	Allsv	25	7	18	0	1,438	74	0	3.09	.887	—	—	—	—	—	—	—	—
2020–21	EC Red Bull Salzburg	ICEHL	13	5	7	0	771	34	0	2.65	.916	4	1	2	182	7	0	2.30	.916
2021–22	Almtuna IS	Allsv	10	0	9	0	555	41	0	4.43	.841	—	—	—	—	—	—	—	—
2021–22	Väsby IK	Div.1	14	6	8	0	—	—	0	3.11	.900	4	0	4	—	—	0	4.22	.857
SHL totals			1	0	1	0	40	3	0	4.50	.857	—	—	—	—	—	—	—	—

=== International ===
Year	Team	Event	GP	W	L	T	MIN	GA	SO	GAA	SV%
2018	Sweden	U18	1	1	0	0	60	3	0	3.00	.885
2020	Sweden	WJC	1	1	0	0	60	2	0	2.00	.895
Junior totals			2	2	0	0	120	5	0	2.50	.890
