= Zakharovo, Teykovsky District, Ivanovo Oblast =

Zakharovo Захарово
- Village
- Location within Ivanovo Oblast Location within Russia
- Coordinates: 56°45′N 40°10′E
- Country: Russia
- Region: Ivanovo Oblast
- District: Teykovsky District
- Time zone: UTC+3:00

Zakharovo (Russian: Захарово) is a rural locality (a village) in Teykovsky District, Ivanovo Oblast, Russia. Population: 14 (2010 census);

== Geography ==
This rural locality is located 24 kilometres (15 mi) from Teykovo (the district's administrative centre), 55 kilometres (34 mi) from Ivanovo (capital of Ivanovo Oblast) and 192 kilometres (119 mi) from Moscow. Mytishchi is the nearest rural locality.
