= Zakharovo, Sokolsky District, Vologda Oblast =

Zakharovo Захарово
- Village
- Location within Vologda Oblast Location within Russia
- Coordinates: 59°36′N 39°58′E
- Country: Russia
- Region: Vologda Oblast
- District: Sokolsky District
- Time zone: UTC+3:00

Zakharovo (Russian: Захарово) is a rural locality (a village) in Arkhangelskoye Rural Settlement, Sokolsky District, Vologda Oblast, Russia. The population was 3 as of 2002.

== Geography ==
Zakharovo is located 23 km northwest of Sokol (the district's administrative centre) by road. Vasilyovo is the nearest rural locality.
