= Vukota Pavić =

Montenegrin basketball player

Free Agent
- Position: Power forward

Personal information
- Born: February 3, 1993 (age 33) Nikšić, Montenegro, FR Yugoslavia
- Listed height: 2.03 m (6 ft 8 in)
- Listed weight: 100 kg (220 lb)

Career information
- NBA draft: 2015: undrafted
- Playing career: 2010–present

Career history
- 2010–2011: Bonus Nikšić
- 2011–2014: Mornar Bar
- 2014–2015: Balkan Botevgrad
- 2015–2016: Sutjeska
- 2016: HKK Zrinjski Mostar
- 2016: Feni Industries
- 2016–2021: Mornar Bar
- 2019: → Lovćen 1947

Career highlights
- Montenegrin League champion (2018)
Medals
Representing Montenegro
Men's basketball
Games of the Small States of Europe
Silver medal – second place	2017 San Marino	National Team

Vukota Pavić (born February 3, 1993) is a Montenegrin professional basketball player, who lastly played for Mornar Bar of the Montenegrin League.

== Professional career ==
On November 16, 2016, Pavić signed for the rest of the season with the Montenegrin club Mornar Bar.
