= Zakharov, Chernyshkovsky District, Volgograd Oblast =

Zakharov Захаров
- Khutor
- Location within Volgograd Oblast Location within Russia
- Coordinates: 48°09′N 42°45′E
- Country: Russia
- Region: Volgograd Oblast
- District: Chernyshkovsky District
- Time zone: UTC+4:00

Zakharov (Russian: Захаров) is a rural locality (a khutor) and the administrative center of Zakharovskoye Rural Settlement, Chernyshkovsky District, Volgograd Oblast, Russia. The population was 518 as of 2010. There are 20 streets.

== Geography ==
Zakharov is located 54 km southeast of Chernyshkovsky (the district's administrative centre) by road. Tormosin is the nearest rural locality.
