= Nick Spires =

English-born Swedish basketball player

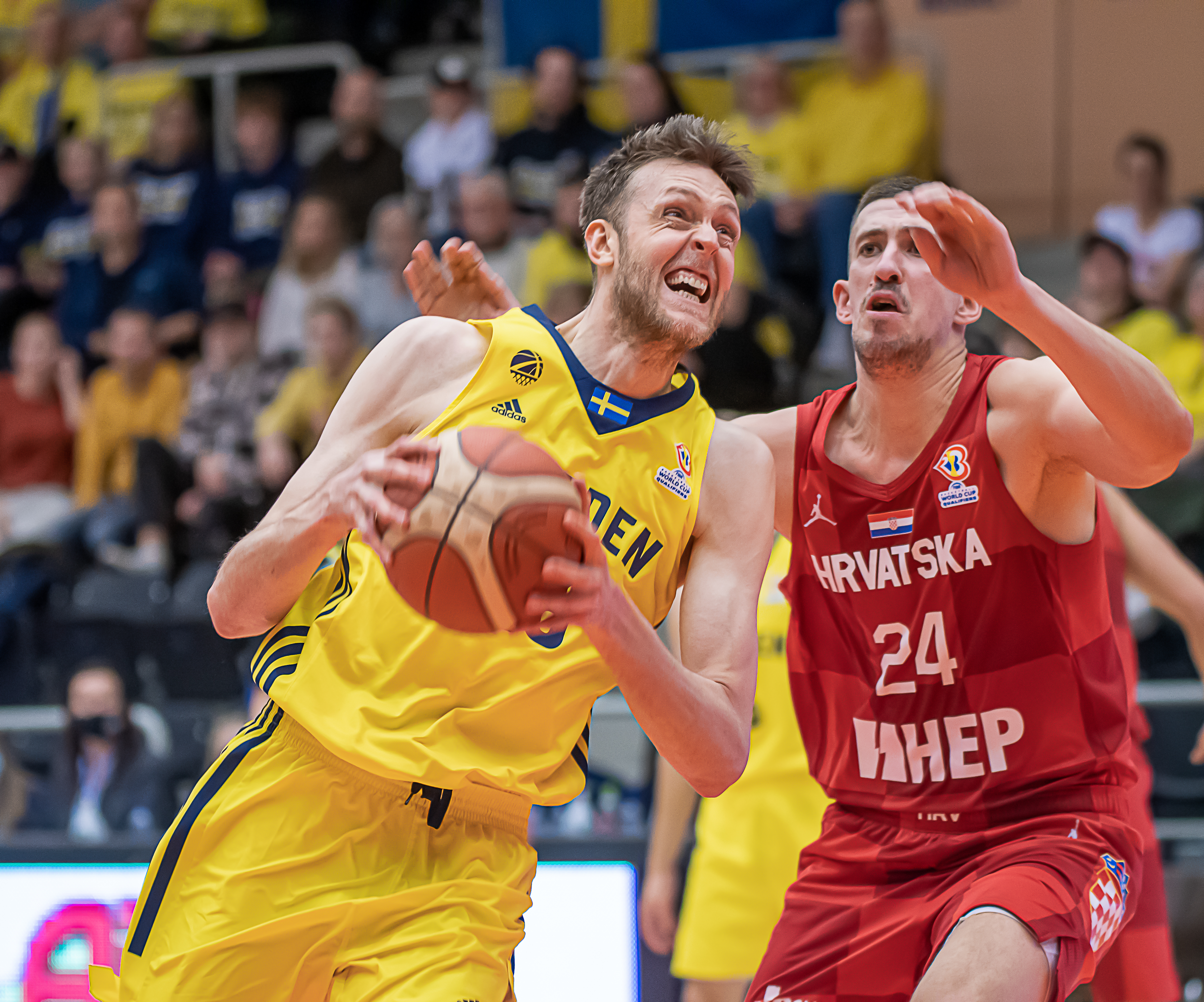
- Spires (left) in 2022

No. 28 – Norrköping Dolphins
- Position: Power forward / center
- League: Basketligan; FIBA Europe Cup

Personal information
- Born: 25 February 1994 (age 32) Royal Tunbridge Wells, England
- Listed height: 2.10 m (6 ft 11 in)

Career information
- Playing career: 2011–present

Career history
- 2015–2017: Södertälje Kings
- 2017–2020: Obradoiro CAB
- 2020–2021: Real Betis
- 2021–2022: Spójnia Stargard
- 2022–present: Norrköping Dolphins

Nicholas Spires (born 25 February 1994) is an England-born Swedish professional basketball player.

In the past, he played for Spójnia Stargard of the Polish Basketball League (PLK).

He has played professionally in several countries, including Sweden and Spain. On 22 July 2020 Spires signed with Real Betis. On 9 December 2021 Spires signed with Spójnia Stargard.

He has been a member of the Swedish national basketball team.

== Career statistics ==
=== National team ===
Team	Tournament	Pos.	GP	PPG	RPG	APG
Sweden	EuroBasket 2025	16th	2	2.5	1.0	0.5
