= Juraj Segarić =

Croatian basketball player

KK Sonik-Puntamika
- Position: Point guard
- League: HT Premijer liga

Personal information
- Born: June 20, 1993 (age 33) Zadar, Croatia
- Listed height: 1.83 m (6 ft 0 in)
- Listed weight: 74 kg (163 lb)

Career information
- Playing career: 2011–present

Career history
- 2011–2012: Borik-Puntamika
- 2012–2014: Zagreb
- 2014–2015: Zadar
- 2015–2016: Široki Primorka
- 2016: Jolly JBS
- 2016–2017: Beroe
- 2017: Jazine-Arbanasi
- 2017: Helios Suns
- 2017-2019: Gostivar
- 2019-: Sonik-Puntamika

Juraj Segarić (born 20 June 1993) is a Croatian professional basketball player, who is currently playing as a point guard for KK Sonik-Puntamika of the HT Premijer liga.
