= Alexander Zakharov (basketball) =

Russian basketball player

Alexander Zakharov Александр Захаров
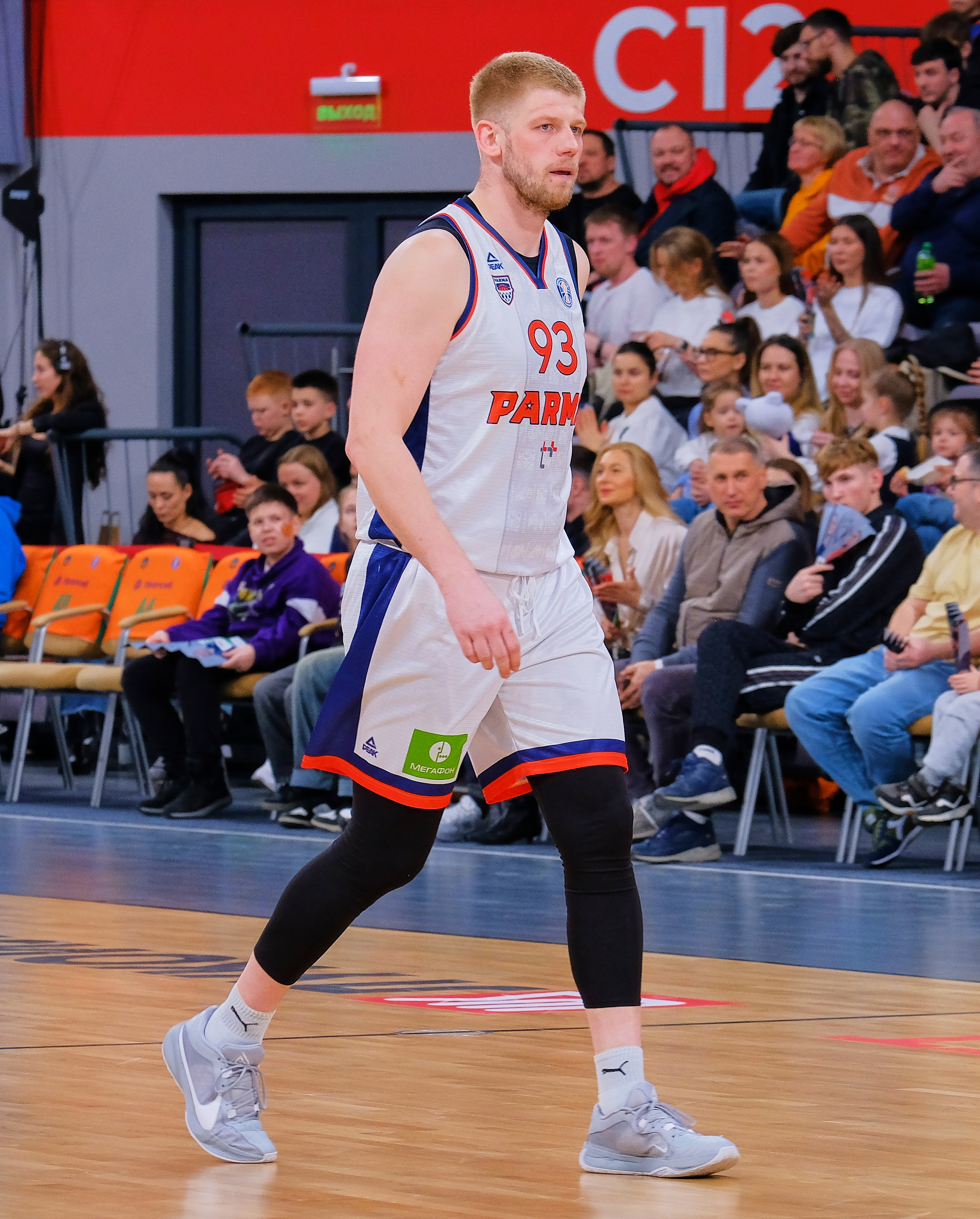
- Zaharov with BC Parma in 2025

No. 93 – Parma
- Position: Power forward
- League: VTB United League

Personal information
- Born: 12 June 1993 (age 33)
- Listed height: 6 ft 8 in (2.03 m)
- Listed weight: 202 lb (92 kg)

Career information
- Playing career: 2008–present

Career history
- 2008–2009: Lobnya
- 2013–2016: BC Khimki
- 2016–2017: Irkut
- 2017–2018: Nizhny Novgorod
- 2018: Nevėžis Kėdainiai
- 2018–2019: Juventus Utena
- 2019–2020: Spartak Primorye
- 2020–2021: Temp-SUMZ-UGMK Revda
- 2021–2024: Uralmash Yekaterinburg
- 2024–present: Parma Basket

Alexander Zakharov (born 12 June 1993) is a Russian professional basketball player for Parma Basket of the VTB United League.

== Trophies ==
=== BC Khimki ===
- Eurocup Basketball: (1)
  - 2015
