= Zakharovo, Rubtsovsky District, Altai Krai =

Zakharovo Захарово
- Selo
- Location within Altai Krai Location within Russia
- Coordinates: 51°39′N 81°19′E
- Country: Russia
- Region: Altai Krai
- District: Rubtsovsky District
- Time zone: UTC+7:00

Zakharovo (Russian: Захарово) is a rural locality (a selo) in Bezrukavsky Selsoviet, Rubtsovsky District, Altai Krai, Russia. The population was 230 as of 2013. There are 4 streets.

== Geography ==
Zakharovo is located 21 km north of Rubtsovsk (the district's administrative centre) by road. Zarnitsa is the nearest rural locality.
