= Zakharovo, Zalesovsky District, Altai Krai =

Zakharovo Захарово
- Selo
- Location within Altai Krai Location within Russia
- Coordinates: 53°58′N 84°25′E
- Country: Russia
- Region: Altai Krai
- District: Zalesovsky District
- Time zone: UTC+7:00

Zakharovo (Russian: Захарово) is a rural locality (a selo) in Dumchevsky Selsoviet, Zalesovsky District, Altai Krai, Russia. The population was 59 as of 2013. There are 4 streets.

== Geography ==
Zakharovo is located 26 km west of Zalesovo (the district's administrative centre) by road. Dumchevo is the nearest rural locality.
