= Erbil Eroğlu =

Turkish basketball player (born 1993)

Sigortam.net İTÜ BB
- Position: Point guard
- League: Basketball Super League

Personal information
- Born: January 23, 1993 (age 33) Şişli, Istanbul, Turkey
- Listed height: 6 ft 4.5 in (1.94 m)
- Listed weight: 187 lb (85 kg)

Career information
- Playing career: 2009–present

Career history
- 2009–2013: Fenerbahçe
- 2012–2013: → Erdemirspor
- 2013–2015: Darüşşafaka Doğuş
- 2015–2017: İstanbul BB
- 2017–2020: Bursaspor
- 2020–present: Sigortam.net İTÜ BB
Medals
Men's basketball
Representing Turkey
FIBA Europe Under-18 Championship
Bronze medal – third place	2011 Wrocław	U-18 Team

Erbil Eroğlu (born January 21, 1993) is a Turkish professional basketball player for Sigortam.net İTÜ BB of the Basketball Super League. He 6 ft 4.5 in (1.94 m) tall and he weighs 187 lb (85 kg). He plays the point guard position.
