= 2022–23 BC CSKA Sofia season =

BC CSKA Sofia
2022–23 season
- President: (Bulgaria) Robert Gergov
- Head coach: (Bulgaria) Rosen Barchovski
- Arena: Arena CSKA
- Bulgarian League: Third place
- Bulgarian Cup: Runners-up
- Biggest win: CSKA 104–71 Beroe (8 April 2023)
- Biggest defeat: CSKA 65–91 Spartak Pleven (10 October 2022)
Home	Away
- All statistics correct as of 16 March 2023.

In the 2022–23 season, BC CSKA Sofia competed in the Bulgarian League and Bulgarian Cup.

== Players ==
=== Current roster ===
Note: Flags indicate national team eligibility at FIBA-sanctioned events. Players may hold other non-FIBA nationalities not displayed.

CSKA Sofia roster
Players
Coaches

Pos.	No.	Nat.	Name	Ht.	Wt.	Age
PG	0	(United States)	Brandon Young	1.93 m (6 ft 4 in)	87 kg (192 lb)	34 – 16 November 1991
G/F	4	(Bulgaria)	Martin Sotirov	2.00 m (6 ft 7 in)	93 kg (205 lb)	27 – 11 July 1999
PF/C	7	(Bulgaria)	Kristiyan Chelenkov	2.04 m (6 ft 8 in)	100 kg (220 lb)	20 – 7 November 2005
G/F	8	(Bulgaria)	Aleksandar Aleksandrov	1.96 m (6 ft 5 in)	83 kg (183 lb)	22 – 4 February 2004
F	9	(Bulgaria)	Aleks Simeonov	2.00 m (6 ft 7 in)	100 kg (220 lb)	33 – 28 March 1993
SF	10	(Bulgaria)	Damyan Minkov	1.97 m (6 ft 6 in)	96 kg (212 lb)	24 – 6 March 2002
F	11	(Bulgaria)	Vladimir Nankinski	1.97 m (6 ft 6 in)	90 kg (198 lb)	22 – 9 September 2004
G/F	13	(Bulgaria)	Georgi Tsekov	1.90 m (6 ft 3 in)	75 kg (165 lb)	20 – 28 October 2005
CG	22	(Bulgaria)	Viktor Gergov	2.00 m (6 ft 7 in)	84 kg (185 lb)	22 – 20 November 2003
PF/C	23	(Bulgaria)	Andrey Ivanov	2.06 m (6 ft 9 in)	100 kg (220 lb)	30 – 7 May 1996
F	25	(Cameroon)	Tamenang Choh	1.96 m (6 ft 5 in)	95 kg (209 lb)	28 – 17 July 1998
PF/C	27	(Serbia)	Dragan Zeković	2.10 m (6 ft 11 in)	108 kg (238 lb)	39 – 27 May 1987
CG	33	(Bulgaria)	Martin Rusev	1.88 m (6 ft 2 in)	82 kg (181 lb)	22 – 20 May 2004
CG	35	(Bulgaria)	Ventsislav Petkov (C)	1.88 m (6 ft 2 in)	80 kg (176 lb)	34 – 14 October 1991
PF/C	77	(The Bahamas)	Zane Knowles	2.08 m (6 ft 10 in)	110 kg (243 lb)	34 – 17 February 1992

Head coach

- (Bulgaria) Rosen Barchovski

Assistant coach(es)

- (Bulgaria) Daniel Klechkov

Strength & conditioning coach(es)

- (Bulgaria) Georgi Davidov

Physiotherapist(s)

- (Bulgaria) Yavor Kasabov

Legend

- (C) Team captain
- Injured

=== Players with multiple nationalities ===
- (United States) (Bulgaria) Brandon Young
- (Serbia) (Bulgaria) Martin Sotirov
- (United States) (Cameroon) Tamenang Choh
- (Montenegro) (Serbia) Dragan Zeković

=== Depth chart ===
Pos.	Starting 5	Bench 1	Bench 2
C	Zane Knowles	Andrey Ivanov
PF	Aleks Simeonov	Dragan Zeković	Kristiyan Chelenkov
SF	Tamenang Choh	Damyan Minkov	Vladimir Nankinski
SG	Martin Sotirov	Viktor Gergov	Aleksandar Aleksandrov
PG	Brandon Young	Ventsislav Petkov	Martin Rusev

=== Roster changes ===
==== In ====
No.	Pos.	Nat.	Name	Moving from		Type	Date	Source
0	PG	(United States)	Brandon Young	Szolnoki Olajbányász	(Hungary)	End of contract	26 July 2022	
23	PF/C	(Bulgaria)	Andrey Ivanov	Chernomorets	(Bulgaria)	End of contract	3 August 2022	
35	CG	(Bulgaria)	Ventsislav Petkov	Levski Sofia	(Bulgaria)	End of contract	9 August 2022	
4	G/F	(Bulgaria)	Martin Sotirov	Beroe	(Bulgaria)	End of contract	12 August 2022	
9	F	(Bulgaria)	Aleks Simeonov	Rilski Sportist	(Bulgaria)	End of contract	15 August 2022	
10	SF	(Bulgaria)	Damyan Minkov	Beroe	(Bulgaria)	End of contract	19 August 2022	
77	PF/C	(The Bahamas)	Zane Knowles	Levski Sofia	(Bulgaria)	End of contract	2 September 2022	
3	CG	(United States)	Ryle Owens	TSU Tbilisi	(Georgia (country))	End of contract	7 October 2022	
30	PG	(United States)	Jordan Callahan	Sluneta Ústí nad Labem	(Czech Republic)	End of contract	21 November 2022	
25	F	(Cameroon)	Tamenang Choh	Brown Bears	(United States)	End of contract	30 January 2023	
27	PF/C	(Serbia)	Dragan Zeković	BCM U Pitești	(Romania)	End of contract	9 February 2023	

==== Out ====
No.	Pos.	Nat.	Name	Moving to		Type	Date	Source
30	PG	(United States)	Jordan Callahan	Esgueira	(Portugal)	End of contract	23 January 2023	
3	CG	(United States)	Ryle Owens	APOEL Nicosia	(Cyprus)	End of contract	9 February 2023	
34	CG	(Bulgaria)	Viktor Margaritov	Enigma Fireworks	(Bulgaria)	-	28 February 2023	-

== Competitions ==
=== Overall ===
Competition	Started round	Final position / round	First match	Last match
NBL	Matchday 1	3rd	10 October 2022	28 May 2023
Bulgarian Cup	Quarterfinals	Runner-up	21 March 2023	24 March 2023

Updated to match played 28 May 2023
Source: Competitions

=== Overview ===
Competition	Record							
Competition	Pld	W	D	L	PF	PA	PD	Win %
NBL	38	25		13	3,182	3,014	+168	65.79
Bulgarian Cup	3	2		1	245	229	+16	66.67
Total	41	27	0	14	3,427	3,243	+184	65.85

Last updated: 28 May 2023
Source: Competitions

== Pre-season and friendlies ==
Win Loss

=== Decathlon Cup ===
23 September 2022 Semifinals	Balkan Botevgrad	80–64	CSKA	Plovdiv
17:00	Scoring by quarter: 26-22, 19-16, 15-11, 20-15
	Pts: Harrow 17; Rebs: Suarez 12; Asts: Harrow, Toshkov 4 PIR: Dimitrov 19	Report	Pts: Young 19; Rebs: Simeonov 10; Asts: Sotirov 3 PIR: Simeonov 18	Arena: SILA; Referees: Stefan Stefanov, Serafim Petrov, Bozhidar Jordanov

24 September 2022 Match for third place	CSKA	74–62	Yambol	Plovdiv
19:00	Scoring by quarter: 24–12, 19-18, 20–11, 11-21
	Pts: Simeonov 23; Rebs: Knowles 15; Asts: Petkov 7 PIR: Knowles 27	Report	Pts: Marinov 14; Rebs: Lilov, Vachev 4 Asts: Lilov 5 PIR: Tavares 11	Arena: SILA; Attendance: 60; Referees: Angel Ivanov, Serafim Petrov, Dimitar Georgiev

=== Yambol Cup ===
29 September 2022 Semifinals	Beroe	79–94	CSKA	Yambol
17:30	Scoring by quarter: 17-25, 21-20, 24-25, 17-24
	Pts: Hudson 23; Rebs: Todorovic, Ivanov 4 Asts: Ivanov 6 PIR: Hudson 29	Report	Pts: Young 22; Rebs: Ivanov 11; Asts: Young 7 PIR: Simeonov 29	Arena: Diana; Attendance: 200; Referees: Iskren Manolov, Stefan Stefanov, Ivaylo Ivanov

30 September 2022 Final	Yambol	80–76	CSKA	Yambol
19:30	Scoring by quarter: 18-16, 23-25, 19-14, 20-21
	Pts: Lilov 21; Rebs: Lilov, Marinov 6 Asts: Gerganov 6 PIR: Marinov 21	Report	Pts: Young, Ivanov 17; Rebs: Ivanov 10; Asts: Simeonov 6 PIR: Ivanov 25	Arena: Diana; Referees: Ivaylo Resilovski, Stefan Stefanov, Ivaylo Ivanov

== Bulgarian League ==
=== Regular season ===
Pos	Team	Pld	W	L	PF	PA	PD	Pts	Qualification
1	Rilski Sportist	30	26	4	2728	2312	+416	56	Advance to playoffs
2	Balkan Botevgrad	30	23	7	2576	2275	+301	53	Advance to playoffs
3	CSKA Sofia	30	20	10	2506	2381	+125	50	Advance to playoffs
4	Chernomorets	30	19	11	2629	2438	+191	49	Advance to playoffs
5	Spartak Pleven	30	16	14	2522	2431	+91	46	Advance to playoffs
6	Levski	30	15	15	2399	2351	+48	45	Advance to playoffs
7	Beroe	30	14	16	2568	2677	−109	44	Advance to playoffs
8	Academic Plovdiv	30	11	19	2400	2537	−137	41	Advance to playoffs
9	Yambol	30	9	21	2373	2602	−229	39	
10	Shumen	30	6	24	2278	2687	−409	36	
11	Cherno More	30	6	24	2516	2804	−288	36	

Source: NBL

=== Matches ===
Win Loss

10 October 2022 1	CSKA	65–91	Spartak Pleven	Sofia
19:00	Scoring by quarter: 10-24, 14–25, 25-19, 16–23
Max Sport 2	Pts: Owens 17; Rebs: Ivanov 10; Asts: Petkov 4 PIR: Knowles 17	Report	Pts: Benson 21; Rebs: Stoyanov 7 Asts: Hadjirusev, Stoyanov 6 PIR: Benson 24	Arena: Arena CSKA; Attendance: 350; Referees: Martin Horozov, Ivan Marinov, Mladen Subashiev

13 October 2022 2	Shumen	68–70	CSKA	Shumen
18:00	Scoring by quarter: 20–27, 23–9, 14–20, 11–14
	Pts: Adewunmi 17; Rebs: Adewunmi 10; Asts: Sekulov, Adewunmi, Serafimov 3 PIR: Adewunmi 16	Report	Pts: Simeonov 19; Rebs: Knowles 12; Asts: Petkov 5 PIR: Knowles 28	Arena: Arena Shumen; Attendance: 753; Referees: Stanimir Rusev, Iskren Manolov, Petar Petrov

22 October 2022 3	CSKA	78–72	Balkan Botevgrad	Sofia
19:00	Scoring by quarter: 22–20, 20-15, 17–20, 19–17
Max Sport 2	Pts: Ivanov 19; Rebs: Knowles 13; Asts: Simeonov, Petkov 4 PIR: Ivanov 29	Report	Pts: Zahariev 19; Rebs: Foster 9 Asts: Harrow 8 PIR: Ivanov 21	Arena: Arena CSKA; Attendance: 350; Referees: Ventsislav Velikov, Angel Ivanov, Tatyana Valcheva

29 October 2022 4	Rilski Sportist	84–72	CSKA	Samokov
19:00	Scoring by quarter: 23-17, 24-15, 15-22, 22-18
Max Sport 2	Pts: Wiggins, Randolph 19; Rebs: Wiggins 8 Asts: Karamfilov 10; PIR: Wiggins 28	Report	Pts: Owens 30; Rebs: Knowles 9 Asts: Simeonov 5 PIR: Knowles, Owens 23	Arena: Arena Samokov; Attendance: 400; Referees: Ivan Marinov, Tatyana Valcheva, Konstantin Rusev

21 November 2022 6	Levski	95–92(OT)	CSKA	Sofia
19:00	Scoring by quarter: 25-20, 21-25, 16-25, 20-12, Overtime: 13-10
Max Sport 2	Pts: Florveus 27; Rebs: Georgiev 11; Asts: Georgiev 9 PIR: Georgiev 42	Report	Pts: Owens 25; Rebs: Knowles 11; Asts: Simeonov 7 PIR: Knowles 28	Arena: Universiada; Attendance: 1,000; Referees: Nikolay Tsintsarski, Stanimir Rusev, Mladen Subashiev

28 November 2022 7	Beroe	85–81	CSKA	Stara Zagora
19:00	Scoring by quarter: 19–21, 27-24, 11–19, 28-17
Max Sport 2	Pts: Hudson 20; Rebs: Edogi 12; Asts: Todorovic 4 PIR: Hudson 26	Report	Pts: Knowles 24; Rebs: Ivanov 11; Asts: Callahan 10; PIR: Knowles 37	Arena: Municipal Hall; Attendance: 250; Referees: Martin Horozov, Ivan Marinov, Angel Ivanov

5 December 2022 8	CSKA	80–63	Chernomorets	Sofia
19:00	Scoring by quarter: 18–17, 15–18, 19–9, 28–19
Max Sport 2	Pts: Knowles 18; Rebs: Simeonov 12; Asts: Callahan 6 PIR: Knowles 21	Report	Pts: Boyanov 19; Rebs: Boyanov 12; Asts: Tutu, Titkov 6 PIR: Boyanov 20	Arena: Arena CSKA; Attendance: 150; Referees: Ivaylo Resilovski, Slavcho Nuchev, Tatyana Valcheva

8 December 2022 9	Yambol	90–65	CSKA	Yambol
18:00	Scoring by quarter: 15-16, 35-15, 28–14, 12-20
	Pts: Tavares 27; Rebs: Sampson, Morris 6 Asts: Lilov 5 PIR: Tavares 28	Report	Pts: Callahan 15; Rebs: Knowles, Ivanov 7 Asts: Callahan 6 PIR: Callahan, Sotirov 13	Arena: Diana; Attendance: 500; Referees: Ventsislav Velikov, Iskren Manolov, Serafim Petrov

12 December 2022 10	CSKA	97–84	Cherno More	Sofia
19:00	Scoring by quarter: 25-29, 21–16, 19–16, 32–23
Max Sport 2	Pts: Knowles 32; Rebs: Knowles 14; Asts: Callahan, Sotirov 6 PIR: Knowles 37	Report	Pts: Unruh 19; Rebs: Ugba 10; Asts: Toshkov 8 PIR: Ugba 21	Arena: Arena CSKA; Attendance: 120; Referees: Nikolay Tsintsarski, Slavcho Nuchev, Ivan Metodiev

17 December 2022 11	CSKA	82–75	Academic Plovdiv	Sofia
18:00	Scoring by quarter: 22–18, 13–16, 19-26, 28–15
	Pts: Simeonov 23; Rebs: Knowles 8 Asts: Simeonov 10; PIR: Simeonov 33	Report	Pts: Bachev 18; Rebs: Creammer 8 Asts: Krayem 8 PIR: Krayem, Kikrilis 15	Arena: Arena CSKA; Attendance: 100; Referees: Ivan Marinov, Vladimir Zanev, Mladen Subashiev

21 December 2022 12	Spartak Pleven	84–86	CSKA	Pleven
19:00	Scoring by quarter: 23–19, 23-26, 20–20, 18–21
Max Sport 2	Pts: Marincheshki 19; Rebs: Marincheshki 10; Asts: Marinov 5 PIR: Marincheshki 29	Report	Pts: Simeonov, Knowles 22; Rebs: Simeonov 8 Asts: Callahan 11; PIR: Simeonov 27	Arena: Balkanstroy; Attendance: 752; Referees: Kaloyan Kostov, Ivan Marinov, Serafim Petrov

28 December 2022 13	CSKA	79–58	Shumen	Sofia
18:00	Scoring by quarter: 16–15, 13–19, 27–13, 23–11
	Pts: Knowles 20; Rebs: Owens 11; Asts: Owens 6 PIR: Knowles 32	Report	Pts: Georgiev 18; Rebs: Georgiev 11; Asts: Sekulov 4 PIR: Sekulov 19	Arena: Arena CSKA; Attendance: 150; Referees: Vladimir Zanev, Tatyana Valcheva, Ivan Metodiev

7 January 2023 14	Balkan Botevgrad	81–67	CSKA	Botevgrad
19:00	Scoring by quarter: 22–21, 23–16, 17–15, 19–15
Max Sport 2	Pts: Zahariev 20; Rebs: Suarez 13; Asts: Diplaros 6 PIR: Zahariev 28	Report	Pts: Knowles 20; Rebs: Knowles 8 Asts: Owens 5 PIR: Knowles 19	Arena: Arena Botevgrad; Attendance: 400; Referees: Stanimir Rusev, Serafim Petrov, Iliyan Tsvetanov

16 January 2023 15	CSKA	76–82	Rilski Sportist	Sofia
19:00	Scoring by quarter: 15–21, 19–12, 26-31, 16-18
Max Sport 2	Pts: Owens 17; Rebs: Ivanov 9 Asts: Owens 4 PIR: Minkov 18	Report	Pts: Wiggins 21; Rebs: Wiggins 8 Asts: Kostov 7 PIR: Wiggins 34	Arena: Arena CSKA; Attendance: 250; Referees: Ivan Marinov, Iskren Manolov, Slavcho Nuchev

21 January 2023 17	CSKA	78–52	Levski	Sofia
19:00	Scoring by quarter: 23–5, 16–19, 21–15, 18–13
Max Sport 2	Pts: Simeonov 20; Rebs: Simeonov 11; Asts: Gergov 5 PIR: Knowles 32	Report	Pts: Georgiev 12; Rebs: Mihaylov 11; Asts: Dimitrov 4 PIR: Mihaylov 16	Arena: Arena CSKA; Attendance: 300; Referees: Ventsislav Velikov, Martin Horozov, Vladimir Zanev

30 January 2023 18	CSKA	96–68	Beroe	Sofia
19:00	Scoring by quarter: 28–18, 20–16, 24–18, 24-16
Max Sport 2	Pts: Sotirov 25; Rebs: Sotirov 8 Asts: Young 7 PIR: Sotirov 30	Report	Pts: Hall 26; Rebs: Edogi 6 Asts: Kombakov 5 PIR: Hall 28	Arena: Arena CSKA; Attendance: 200; Referees: Ventsislav Velikov, Stefan Stefanov, Mladen Subashiev

4 February 2023 19	Chernomorets	100–84	CSKA	Burgas
19:00	Scoring by quarter: 20–15, 30–26, 25–19, 13–10
	Pts: Tucker, Boyanov 23; Rebs: Mawien, Lepichev, Boyanov 10; Asts: Tutu 13; PIR: Boyanov 36	Report	Pts: Choh 21; Rebs: Simeonov 8 Asts: Sotirov, Knowles, Choh 3 PIR: Choh 33	Arena: Boycho Branzov; Attendance: 500; Referees: Ivaylo Resilovski, Stefan Stefanov, Petar Petrov

8 February 2023 20	CSKA	80–73	Yambol	Sofia
18:00	Scoring by quarter: 23–12, 19–21, 15–19, 23–21
	Pts: Choh 23; Rebs: Simeonov 10; Asts: Sotirov 5 PIR: Choh 28	Report	Pts: Lilov 21; Rebs: Cristiano, Morris 5 Asts: Lilov 6 PIR: Lilov 25	Arena: Arena CSKA; Attendance: 150; Referees: Ivan Marinov, Tatyana Valcheva, Dimitar Georgiev

12 February 2023 21	Cherno More	95–98	CSKA	Varna
18:00	Scoring by quarter: 17-27, 25-22, 21-19, 32-30
	Pts: Unruh 25; Rebs: Jordanov 6 Asts: Moldov, Kotsev 7 PIR: Unruh 29	Report	Pts: Choh 32; Rebs: Choh 11; Asts: Choh 6 PIR: Choh 46	Arena: Hristo Borisov; Attendance: 800; Referees: Kaloyan Kostov, Angel Ivanov, Mladen Subashiev

16 February 2023 22	Academic Plovdiv	73–100	CSKA	Plovdiv
19:00	Scoring by quarter: 16–24, 22-21, 17-29, 18–26
Max Sport 2	Pts: Bachev 21; Rebs: Creammer 10; Asts: Bachev 8 PIR: Bachev 23	Report	Pts: Sotirov 30; Rebs: Choh 14; Asts: Choh 9 PIR: Sotirov 34	Arena: SILA; Attendance: 600; Referees: Ventsislav Velikov, Ivan Marinov, Miroslav Kamburov

6 March 2023 23	CSKA	101–87	Spartak Pleven	Sofia
19:00	Scoring by quarter: 39–23, 18–11, 18-27, 26-26
Max Sport 2	Pts: Choh 32; Rebs: Choh 10; Asts: Young 9 PIR: Choh 49	Report	Pts: Ivkov 18; Rebs: Stoyanov, Chernokozhev 4 Asts: Haynes-Jones 8 PIR: Haynes-Jones 19	Arena: Arena CSKA; Attendance: 300; Referees: Nikolay Tsintsarski, Vladimir Zanev, Stefan Stefanov

11 March 2023 24	Shumen	77–102	CSKA	Shumen
17:30	Scoring by quarter: 18-27, 19-27, 23-26, 17-22
	Pts: El-Amin 32; Rebs: El-Amin 9 Asts: El-Amin 7 PIR: El-Amin 36	Report	Pts: Choh 25; Rebs: Choh 12; Asts: Sotirov 7 PIR: Choh 35	Arena: Mladost; Attendance: 300; Referees: Iskren Manolov, Angel Ivanov, Iliyan Tsvetanov

15 March 2023 25	Balkan Botevgrad	71–81	CSKA	Botevgrad
19:00	Scoring by quarter: 16-27, 15-19, 23-12, 17-23
Max Sport 2	Pts: Suarez 17; Rebs: Suarez 4 Asts: Ivanov 5 PIR: Suarez 20	Report	Pts: Young 30; Rebs: Knowles 13; Asts: Young 5 PIR: Young 37	Arena: Arena Botevgrad; Attendance: 1,000; Referees: Martin Horozov, Ivaylo Resilovski, Serafim Petrov

29 March 2023 26	Rilski Sportist	86–89	CSKA	Samokov
19:00	Scoring by quarter: 12-26, 29-17, 21-25, 24-21
Max Sport 2	Pts: Minchev 20; Rebs: Wiggins, Minchev 6 Asts: Karamfilov 6 PIR: Minchev 19	Report	Pts: Young 20; Rebs: Choh 7 Asts: Young 6 PIR: Young 27	Arena: Arena Samokov; Attendance: 400; Referees: Ivaylo Resilovski, Ivan Marinov, Serafim Petrov

5 April 2023 28	CSKA	77–72	Levski	Sofia
19:00	Scoring by quarter: 21-20, 21-18, 12-17, 23-17
Max Sport 2	Pts: Young 18; Rebs: Sotirov, Choh, Knowles 7 Asts: Choh 6 PIR: Sotirov 19	Report	Pts: Arnett 21; Rebs: Mihaylov 10; Asts: Mihaylov, Dimitrov 5 PIR: Pavlov 23	Arena: Arena CSKA; Attendance: 320; Referees: Ventsislav Velikov, Ivan Marinov, Stefan Stefanov

8 April 2023 29	CSKA	104–71	Beroe	Sofia
16:00	Scoring by quarter: 21-9, 27-27, 26-21, 30-14
	Pts: Knowles 21; Rebs: Choh 9 Asts: Zeković 7 PIR: Knowles 27	Report	Pts: Hall 26; Rebs: Todorovic 7 Asts: Todorovic 3 PIR: Hall 30	Arena: Arena CSKA; Attendance: 100; Referees: Martin Horozov, Angel Ivanov, Dimitar Georgiev

12 April 2023 30	CSKA	88–86	Chernomorets	Sofia
19:00	Scoring by quarter: 21-25, 22-18, 16-20, 29-23
Max Sport 2	Pts: Knowles 23; Rebs: Knowles 10; Asts: Young 7 PIR: Knowles 32	Report	Pts: Boyanov 28; Rebs: Nze 12; Asts: Tutu 9 PIR: Boyanov 29	Arena: Arena CSKA; Attendance: 250; Referees: Ivaylo Resilovski, Stanimir Rusev, Slavcho Nuchev

19 April 2023 31	CSKA	71–75	Yambol	Sofia
19:00	Scoring by quarter: 23-18, 24-17, 13-23, 11-17
	Pts: Knowles 15; Rebs: Zeković 10; Asts: Petkov 5 PIR: Knowles 22	Report	Pts: Sampson 24; Rebs: Lilov 9 Asts: Lilov 8 PIR: Lilov 28	Arena: Arena CSKA; Attendance: 120; Referees: Ivan Marinov, Tatyana Valcheva, Ivan Iliev

23 April 2023 32	Cherno More	84–93	CSKA	Varna
18:30	Scoring by quarter: 24-23, 30-17, 12-35, 18-18
	Pts: Lazarov 20; Rebs: Yordanov 10; Asts: Kotsev 8 PIR: Yordanov 28	Report	Pts: Knowles 23; Rebs: Zeković 8 Asts: Gergov 5 PIR: Knowles 25	Arena: Hristo Borisov; Attendance: 300; Referees: Iskren Manolov, Stefan Stefanov, Iliyan Tsvetanov

26 April 2023 33	Academic Plovdiv	99–74	CSKA	Plovdiv
19:00	Scoring by quarter: 29-18, 24-15, 18-17, 28-24
	Pts: Bachev 17; Rebs: Gugino 9 Asts: Bachev 8 PIR: Bachev 24	Report	Pts: Zeković 17; Rebs: Knowles, Ivanov 8 Asts: Sotirov 8 PIR: Zeković 25	Arena: SILA; Attendance: 250; Referees: Ventsislav Velikov, Ivan Marinov, Vladimir Zanev

=== NBL Playoffs ===
==== Quarterfinals ====
2 May 2023 G1	CSKA	94–77 (Series: 1−0)	Levski	Sofia
19:00	Scoring by quarter: 22-21, 25-16, 26-17, 21-23
Max Sport 2	Pts: Choh 21; Rebs: Petkov, Zeković 6 Asts: Young 12; PIR: Young 35	Report	Pts: Florveus 19; Rebs: Mihaylov 7 Asts: Dimitrov 7 PIR: Florveus 33	Arena: Arena CSKA; Attendance: 300; Referees: Ivaylo Resilovski, Serafim Petrov, Angel Ivanov

5 May 2023 G2	Levski	79–87 (Series: 0−2)	CSKA	Sofia
19:00	Scoring by quarter: 21-28, 12-21, 26-17, 20-21
Max Sport 2	Pts: Florveus 24; Rebs: Mihaylov 9 Asts: Arnett 6 PIR: Florveus 32	Report	Pts: Petkov 20; Rebs: Choh 10; Asts: Young 15; PIR: Petkov 23	Arena: Triaditsa; Attendance: 400; Referees: Ventsislav Velikov, Ivan Marinov, Slavcho Nuchev

==== Semifinals ====
12 May 2023 G1	Balkan Botevgrad	79–90 (Series: 0-1)	CSKA	Botevgrad
19:00	Scoring by quarter: 24-23, 16-19, 9-20, 30-28
Max Sport 2	Pts: Suarez 23; Rebs: Suarez 9 Asts: Ivanov 5 PIR: Suarez 29	Report	Pts: Choh 24; Rebs: Knowles 10; Asts: Young 9 PIR: Choh 33	Arena: Arena Botevgrad; Attendance: 2,500; Referees: Ventsislav Velikov, Stanimir Rusev, Stefan Stefanov

14 May 2023 G2	Balkan Botevgrad	80–71 (Series: 1-1)	CSKA	Botevgrad
19:00	Scoring by quarter: 15-16, 28-17, 21-14, 16-24
Max Sport 2	Pts: Suarez 22; Rebs: Suarez 11; Asts: Ivanov, Zahariev 4 PIR: Suarez 37	Report	Pts: Choh 19; Rebs: Choh 12; Asts: Gergov, Young 4 PIR: Choh 32	Arena: Arena Botevgrad; Attendance: 1,400; Referees: Martin Horozov, Ivaylo Resilovski, Iskren Manolov

17 May 2023 G3	CSKA	70–85 (Series: 1-2)	Balkan Botevgrad	Sofia
19:00	Scoring by quarter: 21-27, 19-14, 16-24, 14-20
Max Sport 2	Pts: Young 20; Rebs: Simeonov 9 Asts: Young 4 PIR: Young 24	Report	Pts: Jackson 21; Rebs: Adel, Suarez 5 Asts: Ivanov 8 PIR: Jackson 22	Arena: Arena CSKA; Attendance: 450; Referees: Ventsislav Velikov, Kaloyan Kostov, Slavcho Nuchev

19 May 2023 G4	CSKA	83–92 (Series: 1-3)	Balkan Botevgrad	Sofia
19:00	Scoring by quarter: 20-18, 27-31, 15-17, 21-26
Max Sport 2	Pts: Choh 22; Rebs: Simeonov 9 Asts: Young 7 PIR: Choh 27	Report	Pts: Suarez 31; Rebs: Suarez 6 Asts: Diplaros 7 PIR: Suarez 40	Arena: Arena CSKA; Attendance: 500; Referees: Martin Horozov, Nikolay Tsintsarski, Mladen Subashiev

==== Third place games ====
26 May 2023 G1	Rilski Sportist	71–88 (Series: 0-1)	CSKA	Samokov
19:00	Scoring by quarter: 13-23, 17-22, 24-25, 17-18
	Pts: Yanev 16; Rebs: Minchev 8 Asts: Karamfilov 12; PIR: Yanev 19	Report	Pts: Choh 25; Rebs: Choh, Ivanov 10; Asts: Choh, Young 7 PIR: Choh 40	Arena: Arena Samokov; Attendance: 350; Referees: Ivan Marinov, Nikolay Tsintsarski, Tatyana Valcheva

28 May 2023 G2	CSKA	86–72 (Series: 2-0)	Rilski Sportist	Sofia
19:00	Scoring by quarter: 26-17, 24-19, 20-23, 16-13
Max Sport 2	Pts: Sotirov 25; Rebs: Simeonov, Ivanov 10; Asts: Ivanov 7 PIR: Choh 35	Report	Pts: Minchev 20; Rebs: Wiggins 9 Asts: Karamfilov 8 PIR: Minchev 28	Arena: Arena CSKA; Attendance: 300; Referees: Ivaylo Resilovski, Iskren Manolov, Slavcho Nuchev

== Bulgarian Cup ==
Win Loss

21 March 2023 Quarterfinals	CSKA	82–63	Spartak Pleven	Sofia
18:00	Scoring by quarter: 24-17, 13-14, 29-16, 16-16
Max Sport 2	Pts: Choh 23; Rebs: Choh 12; Asts: Young 6 PIR: Choh 36	Report	Pts: Haynes-Jones 23; Rebs: Chernokozhev 9 Asts: Haynes-Jones 5 PIR: Haynes-Jones 22	Arena: Arena Sofia; Attendance: 500; Referees: Ivaylo Resilovski, Ivan Marinov, Miroslav Kamburov

22 March 2023 Semifinals	CSKA	82–80(OT)	Balkan Botevgrad	Sofia
20:15	Scoring by quarter: 14-22, 20-16, 21-8, 17-26, Overtime: 10-8
Max Sport 2	Pts: Young 17; Rebs: Knowles 12; Asts: Young 7 PIR: Young 19	Report	Pts: Suarez 20; Rebs: Suarez 12; Asts: Jackson 7 PIR: Suarez 28	Arena: Arena Sofia; Attendance: 1,000; Referees: Martin Horozov, Nikolay Tsintsarski, Kaloyan Kostov

24 March 2023 Final	Levski	86–81	CSKA	Sofia
18:00	Scoring by quarter: 20-27, 24-15, 24-14, 18-25
Max Sport 2	Pts: Arnett 22; Rebs: Florveus 6 Asts: Georgiev, Velikov 5 PIR: Pavlov 19	Report	Pts: Young 21; Rebs: Choh 10; Asts: Young 7 PIR: Young, Choh 30	Arena: Arena Sofia; Attendance: 6,000; Referees: Ventsislav Velikov, Martin Horozov, Ivaylo Resilovski

== Individual awards ==
Bulgarian League

Player of the round

- (The Bahamas) Zane Knowles – Round 7
- (United States) Tamenang Choh – Round 21
- (United States) Tamenang Choh – Round 23
