= 2019–20 Basketball Champions League playoffs =

The 2019–20 Basketball Champions League playoffs will begin on 3 March, and will end on 3 May, with the Final, which will decide the champions of the 2019–20 Basketball Champions League. 16 teams compete in the play-offs.

== Format ==
The playoffs involved the sixteen teams which qualified between the four first teams of each of the four groups in the 2019–20 Basketball Champions League Regular season.

The group winners will face the fourth qualified teams and the runners-up will play against the third qualified teams. Winners and runners-up will play the second leg at home. In addition, the winners of the matches involving the group winners will play also the first match and the third, if necessary, of the quarterfinals at home.

Each tie in the playoffs, apart from the Final Four games, will be played with best-of-three playoff format, with the seeded team playing matches 1 and 3 if necessary at home.

For the round of 16, teams from the same group cannot be drawn against each other.

Due to the coronavirus pandemic the format was changed and a Final Eight replaced the quarterfinals.

== Qualified teams ==
Key to colors
Seeded teams	Unseeded teams

Group	Winners	Runners-up	Third	Fourth
A	(Turkey) Türk Telekom	(Italy) Dinamo Sassari	(Belgium) Filou Oostende	(Lithuania) Lietkabelis
B	(Israel) Hapoel Jerusalem	(Greece) AEK	(Spain) San Pablo Burgos	(Turkey) Teksüt Bandırma
C	(Czech Republic) ERA Nymburk	(Spain) Iberostar Tenerife	(Russia) Nizhny Novgorod	(Greece) Peristeri Winmasters
D	(Spain) Casademont Zaragoza	(France) JDA Dijon	(Germany) Telekom Baskets Bonn	(Turkey) Beşiktaş Sompo Sigorta

== Bracket ==
Round of 16
(Turkey) Türk Telekom	2
(Turkey) Beşiktaş Sompo Sigorta	0
(France) JDA Dijon	2
(Russia) Nizhny Novgorod	1
(Israel) Hapoel Jerusalem	2
(Greece) Peristeri Winmasters	0
(Italy) Dinamo Sassari	0
(Spain) San Pablo Burgos	2
(Spain) Casademont Zaragoza	2
(Lithuania) Lietkabelis	0
(Spain) Iberostar Tenerife	2
(Belgium) Filou Oostende	1
(Czech Republic) ERA Nymburk	2
(Turkey) Teksüt Bandırma	0
(Greece) AEK	2
(Germany) Telekom Baskets Bonn	0

Quarterfinals
30 September
(Turkey) Türk Telekom	82
(France) JDA Dijon	83
30 September
(Israel) Hapoel Jerusalem	65
(Spain) San Pablo Burgos	92
1 October
(Spain) Casademont Zaragoza	87
(Spain) Iberostar Tenerife	81
1 October
(Czech Republic) ERA Nymburk	82
(Greece) AEK	94

Semifinals
2 October
(France) JDA Dijon	69
(Spain) San Pablo Burgos	81
2 October
(Spain) Casademont Zaragoza	75
(Greece) AEK	99

Final
4 October
(Spain) San Pablo Burgos	85
(Greece) AEK	74
Third place game
4 October
(France) JDA Dijon	70
(Spain) Casademont Zaragoza	65

== Round of 16 ==
Team 1	Series	Team 2	Game 1	Game 2	Game 3
Hapoel Jerusalem (Israel)	2–0	(Greece) Peristeri Winmasters	91–78	79–73	—
Casademont Zaragoza (Spain)	2–0	(Lithuania) Lietkabelis	76–67	90–88	—
ERA Nymburk (Czech Republic)	2–0	(Turkey) Teksüt Bandırma	92–70	86–72	—
Türk Telekom (Turkey)	2–0	(Turkey) Beşiktaş Sompo Sigorta	89–78	84–66	—
Iberostar Tenerife (Spain)	2–1	(Belgium) Filou Oostende	85–75	69–75	62–54
Dinamo Sassari (Italy)	0–2	(Spain) San Pablo Burgos	81–84	80–95	—
JDA Dijon (France)	2–1	(Russia) Nizhny Novgorod	88–73	79–88	75–67
AEK (Greece)	2–0	(Germany) Telekom Baskets Bonn	92–85	90–86	—

=== First leg ===
3 March 2020	ERA Nymburk (Czech Republic)	92–70 (Series: 1–0)	(Turkey) Teksüt Bandırma	Prague
19:00	Scoring by quarter: 29–19, 27–21, 23–12, 13–18
	Pts: Hruban 19; Rebs: Hruban 9 Asts: Booker 5 Eff: Hruban 24	Boxscore	Pts: Hazer 17; Rebs: Haltalı, Yılmaz 8 Asts: Hazer 5 Eff: Haltalı, Hazer 16	Arena: Královka Arena; Referees: Antonio Conde (ESP), Andrei Sharapa (BLR), Kristaps Konstantīnovs (LAT)

3 March 2020	Iberostar Tenerife (Spain)	85–75 (Series: 1–0)	(Belgium) Filou Oostende	San Cristóbal de La Laguna
20:30	Scoring by quarter: 29–20, 19–17, 16–21, 21–17
	Pts: Shermadini 25; Rebs: Huertas 6 Asts: Huertas 10; Eff: Huertas 29	Boxscore	Pts: Desiron 16; Rebs: Caupain, Sylla 5 Asts: Đorđević 5 Eff: Desiron 21	Arena: Pabellón Insular Santiago Martín; Attendance: 2,881; Referees: Ademir Zurapović (BIH), Gentian Cici (ALB), Martin Horozov (BUL)

4 March 2020	Türk Telekom (Turkey)	89–78 (Series: 1–0)	(Turkey) Beşiktaş Sompo Sigorta	Ankara
18:00	Scoring by quarter: 28–23, 17–19, 22–17, 22–19
	Pts: Campbell 27; Rebs: Fall, Johnson 7 Asts: Campbell 8 Eff: Campbell 31	Boxscore	Pts: Gotcher 16; Rebs: Savaş 10; Asts: Akpınar 5 Eff: Savaş, Yıldızlı 17	Arena: Ankara Arena; Referees: Aleksandar Glišić (SRB), Sergii Zashchuk (UKR), Saša Maričić (SRB)

4 March 2020	Hapoel Jerusalem (Israel)	91–78 (Series: 1–0)	(Greece) Peristeri Winmasters	Jerusalem
18:15	Scoring by quarter: 25–18, 23–28, 24–21, 19–11
	Pts: Thomas 16; Rebs: Thomas 7 Asts: Brown 8 Eff: Brown 21	Boxscore	Pts: Moreira 20; Rebs: Moreira 11; Asts: Kane 4 Eff: Moreira 22	Arena: Pais Arena; Referees: Eddie Viator (FRA), Marius Ciulin (ROU), Zafer Yılmaz (TUR)

4 March 2020	Casademont Zaragoza (Spain)	76–67 (Series: 1–0)	(Lithuania) Lietkabelis	Zaragoza
20:30	Scoring by quarter: 20–20, 24–19, 21–10, 11–18
	Pts: Ennis, Seeley 14; Rebs: Three players Asts: Brussino 4 Eff: Ennis 16	Boxscore	Pts: Šakić 18; Rebs: Lipkevičius 5 Asts: Dimša 3 Eff: Šakić 12	Arena: Pabellón Príncipe Felipe; Attendance: 8,188; Referees: Yohan Rosso (FRA), Yener Yılmaz (TUR), Nicolas Maestre (FRA)

4 March 2020	Dinamo Sassari (Italy)	81–84 (Series: 0–1)	(Spain) San Pablo Burgos	Sassari
20:30	Scoring by quarter: 23–26, 13–25, 32–17, 13–16
	Pts: Spissu 17; Rebs: Pierre 11; Asts: Spissu 4 Eff: Spissu 18	Boxscore	Pts: Benite 30; Rebs: Rivero 9 Asts: Bassas 5 Eff: Benite 32	Arena: Palasport Roberta Serradimigni; Referees: Oskars Lucis (LAT), Boris Krejič (SLO), Alexey Davydov (RUS)

4 March 2020	JDA Dijon (France)	88–73 (Series: 1–0)	(Russia) Nizhny Novgorod	Dijon
20:30	Scoring by quarter: 20–17, 24–23, 17–16, 27–17
	Pts: Holston 21; Rebs: Chassang 7 Asts: Julien 7 Eff: Holston 23	Boxscore	Pts: Brown 19; Rebs: Gankevich 7 Asts: Brown 6 Eff: Brown 25	Arena: Palais des Sport Jean-Michel Geoffroy; Referees: Georgios Poursanidis (GRE), Wojciech Liszka (POL), Fernando Calatrava (ESP)

4 March 2020	AEK (Greece)	92–85 (Series: 1–0)	(Germany) Telekom Baskets Bonn	Athens
20:30	Scoring by quarter: 28–26, 24–24, 12–20, 28–15
	Pts: Ray 27; Rebs: Slaughter 10; Asts: Zisis 7 Eff: Ray 27	Boxscore	Pts: Saibou 19; Rebs: Breunig 11; Asts: Frazier 8 Eff: Brown 22	Arena: O.A.C.A. Olympic Indoor Hall; Referees: Manuel Mazzoni (ITA), Mārtiņš Kozlovskis (LAT), Gatis Saliņš (LAT)

=== Second leg ===
10 March 2020	Lietkabelis (Lithuania)	88–90 (Series: 0–2)	(Spain) Casademont Zaragoza	Panevėžys
19:00	Scoring by quarter: 31–25, 23–23, 19–21, 15–21
	Pts: Dimša 18; Rebs: Šakić 5 Asts: three players 5 Eff: Šakić 20	Boxscore	Pts: Brussino 21; Rebs: Thompson 7 Asts: Ennis 7 Eff: Brussino 31	Arena: Cido Arena; Referees: Manuel Mazzoni (ITA), Tolga Sahin (ITA), Thomas Bissuel (FRA)

10 March 2020	Teksüt Bandırma (Turkey)	72–86 (Series: 0–2)	(Czech Republic) ERA Nymburk	Bandırma
20:00	Scoring by quarter: 18–22, 15–26, 16–17, 23–21
	Pts: Şengün 25; Rebs: Şengün 13; Asts: Hazer 8 Eff: Şengün 28	Boxscore	Pts: Hruban 19; Rebs: Dalton 9 Asts: Bohačík 6 Eff: Hruban 28	Arena: Kara Ali Acar Sport Hall; Referees: Aleksandar Glišić (SRB), Sergii Zashchuk (UKR), Martin Vulić (CRO)

10 March 2020	Filou Oostende (Belgium)	75–69 (Series: 1–1)	(Spain) Iberostar Tenerife	Ostend
20:00	Scoring by quarter: 19–17, 22–19, 18–18, 16–15
	Pts: Mwema 17; Rebs: Schwartz 5 Asts: Đorđević 4 Eff: Mwema 15	Boxscore	Pts: Shermadini 19; Rebs: Díez, Shermadini 5 Asts: Huertas, López 4 Eff: Shermadini 18	Arena: Versluys Dôme; Referees: Georgios Poursanidis (GRE), Yener Yılmaz (TUR), Carsten Straube (GER)

10 March 2020	Telekom Baskets Bonn (Germany)	86–90 (Series: 0–2)	(Greece) AEK	Bonn
20:00	Scoring by quarter: 24–23, 25–22, 17–17, 20–28
	Pts: McKinney-Jones 18; Rebs: Breunig, Polas Bartolo 7 Asts: Saibou 5 Eff: McKinney-Jones 17	Boxscore	Pts: Langford 25; Rebs: Slaughter 9 Asts: Chalmers 3 Eff: Slaughter 22	Arena: Telekom Dome; Referees: Yohan Rosso (FRA), Saverio Lanzarini (ITA), Saša Maričić (SRB)

10 March 2020	San Pablo Burgos (Spain)	95–80 (Series: 2–0)	(Italy) Dinamo Sassari	Burgos
20:30	Scoring by quarter: 21–32, 24–11, 29–18, 21–19
	Pts: Clark 22; Rebs: Rivero 15; Asts: Bassas 6 Eff: Rivero 29	Boxscore	Pts: Spissu 24; Rebs: Spissu 5 Asts: Evans, Spissu 5 Eff: Spissu 28	Arena: Coliseum Burgos; Attendance: 0 (under closed doors); Referees: Ademir Zurapović (BIH), Eddie Viator (FRA), Wojciech Liszka (POL)

11 March 2020	Nizhny Novgorod (Russia)	88–79 (Series: 1–1)	(France) JDA Dijon	Nizhny Novgorod
19:00	Scoring by quarter: 24–19, 22–22, 17–20, 25–18
	Pts: Baburin 22; Rebs: Parks 10; Asts: Brown 7 Eff: Parks 23	Boxscore	Pts: Solomon 18; Rebs: Sulaimon 5 Asts: Holston 9 Eff: Sulaimon 17	Arena: CEC Nagorny; Referees: Tomas Jasevičius (LTU), Mārtiņš Kozlovskis (LAT), Radomir Vojinović (SRB)

11 March 2020	Beşiktaş Sompo Sigorta (Turkey)	66–84 (Series: 0–2)	(Turkey) Türk Telekom	Istanbul
20:00	Scoring by quarter: 22–18, 15–28, 14–22, 15–16
	Pts: Savaş 23; Rebs: Savaş 8 Asts: Savaş 5 Eff: Savaş 32	Boxscore	Pts: Johnson 27; Rebs: Türen 9 Asts: Johnson 8 Eff: Johnson 35	Arena: Akatlar Arena; Referees: Antonio Conde (ESP), Marius Ciulin (ROU), Martin Horozov (BUL)

11 March 2020	Peristeri Winmasters (Greece)	73–79 (Series: 0–2)	(Israel) Hapoel Jerusalem	Peristeri
21:30	Scoring by quarter: 11–17, 17–29, 19–7, 26–26
	Pts: Moreira 14; Rebs: Moreira 11; Asts: Hatcher 5 Eff: Moreira 16	Boxscore	Pts: Brown 25; Rebs: Thomas 5 Asts: Brown 5 Eff: Feldeine 21	Arena: Peristeri Arena; Referees: Oskars Lucis (LAT), Gentian Cici (ALB), Alexandre Deman (FRA)

=== Third leg ===
16 September 2020	Iberostar Tenerife (Spain)	62–54 (Series: 2–1)	(Belgium) Filou Oostende	San Cristóbal de La Laguna
19:30	Scoring by quarter: 17–10, 13–20, 21–13, 11–11
	Pts: Huertas 13; Rebs: Cavanaugh, Shermadini 10; Asts: Cavanaugh 4 Eff: Cavanaugh 17	Boxscore	Pts: Welsh 13; Rebs: Welsh 12; Asts: three players 3 Eff: Welsh 23	Arena: Pabellón Insular Santiago Martín; Referees: Yohan Rosso (FRA), Eddie Viator (FRA), Alexandre Deman (FRA)

16 September 2020	JDA Dijon (France)	75–67 (Series: 2–1)	(Russia) Nizhny Novgorod	Dijon
20:30	Scoring by quarter: 20–20, 15–12, 19–23, 21–12
	Pts: Chassang, Holston 20; Rebs: Johnson 7 Asts: Julien 11; Eff: Chassang, Julien 20	Boxscore	Pts: Komolov 18; Rebs: Baburin 7 Asts: Strebkov 7 Eff: Komolov 15	Arena: Palais des Sport Jean-Michel Geoffroy; Referees: Manuel Mazzoni (ITA), Saverio Lanzarini (ITA), Tolga Sahin (ITA)
