= 2019–20 Basketball Champions League =

European basketball tournament

- Season: 2019–20
- Dates: 17 September 2019 – 4 October 2020
- Teams: 48 (total); 32 (regular season)

Regular season
- Season MVP: (United States) Keith Langford

Finals
- Champions: (Spain) San Pablo Burgos (1st title)
- Runners-up: (Greece) AEK
- Third place: (France) JDA Dijon
- Fourth place: (Spain) Casademont Zaragoza

Awards
- Final Eight MVP: (Georgia (country)) Thad McFadden

Statistical leaders
Points	(United States) Justin Dentmon	20.9
Rebounds	(Jamaica) Shevon Thompson	10.1
Assists	(Brazil) Marcelinho Huertas	8.1
Index Rating	(United States) TaShawn Thomas	20.9

Seasons
- ← 2018–19 2020–21 →

The 2019–20 Basketball Champions League is the fourth season of the Basketball Champions League (BCL), a European-wide professional basketball competition for clubs, that was launched by FIBA. The competition began in September 2019, with the qualifying rounds, and was supposed to conclude in May 2020. It featured 16 domestic champion teams. On 12 March 2020, the competition was suspended because of the COVID-19 pandemic.

San Pablo Burgos won its first Champions League title after defeating AEK.

== Format changes ==
For this season, eight teams will come from two qualifying rounds. The round of 16 and quarter-finals changed to best-of-three playoff series instead of two legs. From this season no teams were sent from the regular season to the FIBA Europe Cup, which was the case in each previous BCL season.

=== Changes due to the 2020 coronavirus pandemic ===
On 12 March 2020, FIBA suspended all its competitions, including the BCL, due to the COVID-19 pandemic. On 31 March, the BCL decided the season will have to be finished with a "Final Eight" tournament planned for 30 September until 4 October. The tournament was to be held in a single venue and would be a single-elimination tournament. Two games which were still not played in the Round of 16 took place beforehand.

== Eligibility of players ==
In 2017, FIBA agreed to adopt eligibility rules, forcing the clubs to have at least 5 home-grown players in rosters of 11 or 12 players, or at least four, if the team has got fewer players.

== Team allocation ==
A total of 48 teams from 29 countries will participate in the 2019–20 Basketball Champions League. On June 24, 2019, Benfica entered in the first qualifying round and Mornar were upgraded to the second qualifying round after the Openjobmetis Varese's withdrawal.

=== Teams ===
League positions after eventual playoffs of the previous season shown in parentheses (FEC: FIBA Europe Cup title holders. WC: Wild card).

Qualified teams for 2019–20 Basketball Champions League (by entry round) Regular season
(Turkey) Gaziantep (5th)	(France) SIG Strasbourg (6th)	(Spain) Iberostar Tenerife (9th)	(Italy) Happy Casa Brindisi (5th)
(Turkey) Beşiktaş Sompo Sigorta (6th)	(Greece) AEK (3rd)	(Germany) Rasta Vechta (4th)	(Belgium) Filou Oostende (1st)
(Turkey) Türk Telekom (7th)^{WC}	(Greece) Peristeri Winmasters (4th)	(Germany) Brose Bamberg (5th)	(Czech Republic) ERA Nymburk (1st)
(Turkey) Teksüt Bandırma (8th)^{WC}	(Greece) PAOK (5th)^{WC}	(Israel) Hapoel Jerusalem (3rd)	(Latvia) VEF Rīga (1st)
(France) JDA Dijon (3rd)	(Spain) Casademont Zaragoza (4th)	(Israel) Hapoel Holon (5th)^{WC}	(Lithuania) Neptūnas (3rd)
(France) Pau-Lacq-Orthez (5th)	(Spain) Baxi Manresa (8th)	(Italy) Dinamo Sassari^{FEC} (2nd)	(Poland) Anwil Włocławek (1st)

Second qualifying round
(Belgium) Telenet Giants Antwerp (2nd)	(Germany) Telekom Baskets Bonn (7th)	(Lithuania) Lietkabelis (4th)	(Poland) Polski Cukier Toruń (2nd)
(Spain) San Pablo Burgos (11th)	(Latvia) Ventspils (2nd)	(Montenegro) Mornar (2nd)	(Russia) Nizhny Novgorod (8th)

First qualifying round
(Austria) Kapfenberg Bulls (1st)	(Denmark) Bakken Bears (1st)	(Netherlands) Donar (2nd)	(Slovakia) Inter Bratislava (1st)
(Belarus) Tsmoki Minsk (1st)	(Finland) Karhu (1st)	(Poland) Legia (8th)	(Sweden) Södertälje Kings (1st)
(Bulgaria) Balkan (1st)	(Hungary) Falco Szombathely (1st)	(Portugal) Benfica (2nd)	(Switzerland) Fribourg Olympic (1st)
(Cyprus) Keravnos (1st)	(Kosovo) Sigal Prishtina (1st)	(Romania) Oradea (1st)	(Ukraine) Kyiv Basket (2nd)

== Round and draw dates ==
The schedule of the competition is as follows.

Phase	Round	Draw date	First leg	Second leg	Third leg
Qualifying rounds	First qualifying round	4 July 2019	17 September 2019	20 September 2019	-
Qualifying rounds	Second qualifying round	4 July 2019	26 September 2019	29 September 2019	-
Regular season	Matchday 1	4 July 2019	15–16 October 2019		
Regular season	Matchday 2	4 July 2019	22–23 October 2019		
Regular season	Matchday 3	4 July 2019	29–30 October 2019		
Regular season	Matchday 4	4 July 2019	5–6 November 2019		
Regular season	Matchday 5	4 July 2019	12–13 November 2019		
Regular season	Matchday 6	4 July 2019	19–20 November 2019		
Regular season	Matchday 7	4 July 2019	3–4 December 2019		
Regular season	Matchday 8	4 July 2019	10–11 December 2019		
Regular season	Matchday 9	4 July 2019	17–18 December 2019		
Regular season	Matchday 10	4 July 2019	7–8 January 2020		
Regular season	Matchday 11	4 July 2019	14–15 January 2020		
Regular season	Matchday 12	4 July 2019	21–22 January 2020		
Regular season	Matchday 13	4 July 2019	28–29 January 2020		
Regular season	Matchday 14	4 July 2019	4–5 February 2020		
Play-offs	Round of 16	18 February 2020	3–4 March 2020	10–11 March 2020	17–18 March 2020
Play-offs	Quarter-finals	18 February 2020	30 September–1 October		
Final Four	Semi-finals		2 October 2020		
Final Four	Final		4 October 2020		

== Qualifying rounds ==
=== Draw ===
The 16 teams that entered in the first round were divided into two pots. Seeded teams would play the second leg at home.

Teams from the same country cannot be drawn against each other.

Seeded teams (Denmark) Bakken Bears (Bulgaria) Balkan (Netherlands) Donar (Switzerland) Fribourg Olympic (Ukraine) Kyiv Basket (Poland) Legia (Romania) Oradea (Belarus) Tsmoki Minsk	Non-seeded teams (Portugal) Benfica (Austria) Kapfenberg Bulls (Hungary) Falco Szombathely (Slovakia) Inter Bratislava (Finland) Karhu (Cyprus) Keravnos (Sweden) Södertälje Kings (Kosovo) Sigal Prishtina

=== First qualifying round ===
A total of 16 teams will play in the first qualifying round. The first legs will be played on 17 September, while the second legs on 20 September 2019.

Team 1	Agg.	Team 2	1st leg	2nd leg
Inter Bratislava (Slovakia)	132–156	(Switzerland) Fribourg Olympic	82–67	50–89
Karhu (Finland)	160–154	(Belarus) Tsmoki Minsk	93–86	67–68
Södertälje Kings (Sweden)	153–146	(Bulgaria) Balkan	79–64	74–82
Kapfenberg Bulls (Austria)	129–139	(Ukraine) Kyiv Basket	66–66	63–73
Falco Szombathely (Hungary)	161–158	(Romania) Oradea	71–62	90–96
Sigal Prishtina (Kosovo)	162–166	(Poland) Legia	79–81	83–85
Benfica (Portugal)	161–141	(Netherlands) Donar	95–65	66–76
Keravnos (Cyprus)	180–164	(Denmark) Bakken Bears	86–95	94–69

=== Second qualifying round ===
A total of 16 teams will play in the second qualifying round: eight teams which enter in this round, and the eight winners of the first qualifying round. The first legs will be played on 26 September, while the second legs on 29 September 2019.

Team 1	Agg.	Team 2	1st leg	2nd leg
Keravnos (Cyprus)	137–148	(Lithuania) Lietkabelis	55–71	82–77
Benfica (Portugal)	150–167	(Montenegro) Mornar	68–96	82–71
Karhu (Finland)	151–152	(Poland) Polski Cukier Toruń	93–82	58–70
Falco Szombathely (Hungary)	148–124	(Latvia) Ventspils	75–69	73–55
Södertälje Kings (Sweden)	133–150	(Belgium) Telenet Giants Antwerp	60–82	73–68
Kyiv Basket (Ukraine)	145–182	(Spain) San Pablo Burgos	83–86	62–96
Legia (Poland)	124–152	(Russia) Nizhny Novgorod	61–74	63–78
Fribourg Olympic (Switzerland)	138–160	(Germany) Telekom Baskets Bonn	66–80	72–80

== Regular season ==
The 32 teams are drawn into four groups of eight, with the restriction that teams from the same country cannot be drawn against each other. In each group, teams play against each other home-and-away, in a round-robin format. The group winners, runners-up, third-placed teams and fourth-placed teams, advance to the round of 16, while the remaining four teams in each group of the Regular Season will be eliminated.

A total of 32 teams play in the regular season: 24 teams which enter in this stage, and the eight winners of the second qualifying round. The regular season will start on 8 October 2019 and end on 5 February 2020.

=== Draw ===
Teams were divided into two pots according to the club ranking published by the organization. Twelve teams were named seeded teams while the rest would be unseeded teams. The seeded teams will be split, allocating three per group.

Firstly, the eight teams from qualifying round will be split in the four groups, with a maximum of two teams per group.

Seeded teams
(Greece) AEK	(Israel) Hapoel Jerusalem
(Turkey) Beşiktaş Sompo Sigorta	(Spain) Iberostar Tenerife
(Germany) Brose Bamberg	(Lithuania) Neptūnas
(Czech Republic) ERA Nymburk	(Greece) PAOK
(Italy) Dinamo Sassari	(France) SIG Strasbourg
(Belgium) Filou Oostende	(Turkey) Teksüt Bandırma

=== Group A ===
Pos	Team	Pld	W	L	PF	PA	PD	Pts	Qualification	TTE	DIN	OOS	LIE	MAN	HOL	SIG	TOR
1	(Turkey) Türk Telekom	14	11	3	1173	1075	+98	25	Advance to round of 16	—	64–56	72–66	92–83	78–72	85–71	75–83	100–87
2	(Italy) Dinamo Sassari	14	11	3	1181	1088	+93	25	Advance to round of 16	92–89	—	90–71	79–78	73–74	83–73	90–67	91–71
3	(Belgium) Filou Oostende	14	8	6	1059	1085	−26	22	Advance to round of 16	67–85	88–82	—	80–66	85–72	101–86	64–71	105–103
4	(Lithuania) Lietkabelis	14	7	7	1079	1077	+2	21	Advance to round of 16	77–91	82–86	68–76	—	77–61	78–72	82–69	98–83
5	(Spain) Baxi Manresa	14	7	7	1095	1069	+26	21		80–75	61–64	85–58	76–70	—	65–67	92–68	85–81
6	(Israel) Hapoel Holon	14	6	8	1164	1170	−6	20		79–82	92–94	58–59	68–69	90–88	—	101–94	99–86
7	(France) SIG Strasbourg	14	4	10	1082	1155	−73	18		89–90	83–88	77–64	63–66	81–63	81–86	—	75–97
8	(Poland) Polski Cukier Toruń	14	2	12	1231	1345	−114	16		73–95	95–113	70–75	81–85	102–121	105–122	97–81	—

Source: Basketball Champions League
Legend: Blue = home team win; Red = away team win.

=== Group B ===
Pos	Team	Pld	W	L	PF	PA	PD	Pts	Qualification	JER	AEK	SPB	BAN	VEC	ANW	PAU	TGA
1	(Israel) Hapoel Jerusalem	14	11	3	1254	1151	+103	25	Advance to round of 16	—	85–78	96–91	83–72	98–87	112–94	98–76	94–72
2	(Greece) AEK	14	9	5	1093	1039	+54	23	Advance to round of 16	91–78	—	74–66	84–96	75–79	83–72	102–82	62–51
3	(Spain) San Pablo Burgos	14	8	6	1203	1132	+71	22	Advance to round of 16	91–84	93–76	—	92–84	87–71	110–78	78–82	90–76
4	(Turkey) Teksüt Bandırma	14	8	6	1149	1111	+38	22	Advance to round of 16	69–73	50–68	84–81	—	82–70	86–87	81–66	89–81
5	(Germany) Rasta Vechta	14	6	8	1135	1166	−31	20		74–83	70–81	87–93	73–81	—	89–76	93–86	79–72
6	(Poland) Anwil Włocławek	14	5	9	1212	1279	−67	19		102–107	77–79	100–90	84–89	103–92	—	95–87	80–71
7	(France) Pau-Lacq-Orthez	14	5	9	1087	1171	−84	19		81–75	67–79	80–76	76–96	75–90	85–77	—	75–57
8	(Belgium) Telenet Giants Antwerp	14	4	10	1026	1110	−84	18		73–88	73–61	60–65	93–90	74–81	99–87	74–69	—

Source: Basketball Champions League
Legend: Blue = home team win; Red = away team win.

=== Group C ===
Pos	Team	Pld	W	L	PF	PA	PD	Pts	Qualification	NYM	TFE	NIZ	PER	BRO	GAZ	MOR	VEF
1	(Czech Republic) ERA Nymburk	14	12	2	1147	1014	+133	26	Advance to round of 16	—	68–78	76–72	84–72	91–71	74–72	91–74	75–56
2	(Spain) Iberostar Tenerife	14	11	3	1134	973	+161	25	Advance to round of 16	84–89	—	81–67	72–68	82–64	69–67	91–61	92–59
3	(Russia) Nizhny Novgorod	14	9	5	1073	1042	+31	23	Advance to round of 16	73–82	75–72	—	82–76	76–75	89–64	89–69	80–78
4	(Greece) Peristeri Winmasters	14	8	6	1027	1026	+1	22	Advance to round of 16	75–65	54–80	71–74	—	78–75	87–79	72–67	91–83
5	(Germany) Brose Bamberg	14	7	7	1076	1057	+19	21		80–84	98–96	58–73	72–69	—	86–81	81–76	91–53
6	(Turkey) Gaziantep	14	4	10	1040	1117	−77	18		69–79	65–88	79–76	64–70	66–76	—	86–79	86–79
7	(Montenegro) Mornar	14	4	10	1059	1157	−98	18		66–98	74–81	87–66	65–73	77–73	84–77	—	106–99
8	(Latvia) VEF Rīga	14	1	13	997	1167	−170	15		72–91	64–68	74–81	64–71	55–76	81–85	80–74	—

Source: Basketball Champions League
Legend: Blue = home team win; Red = away team win.

=== Group D ===
Pos	Team	Pld	W	L	PF	PA	PD	Pts	Qualification	ZAR	JDA	BON	BJK	FAL	NEP	PAOK	BRI
1	(Spain) Casademont Zaragoza	14	10	4	1136	1094	+42	24	Advance to round of 16	—	75–60	72–77	80–73	70–69	86–70	86–76	96–93
2	(France) JDA Dijon	14	9	5	1159	1069	+90	23	Advance to round of 16	73–105	—	66–78	88–47	87–68	92–71	81–76	95–79
3	(Germany) Telekom Baskets Bonn	14	8	6	1143	1146	−3	22	Advance to round of 16	85–71	83–72	—	86–82	91–77	97–85	83–85	101–93
4	(Turkey) Beşiktaş Sompo Sigorta	14	7	7	1068	1079	−11	21	Advance to round of 16	73–74	65–98	80–76	—	74–49	76–69	98–83	96–67
5	(Hungary) Falco Szombathely	14	6	8	1115	1109	+6	20		70–77	82–81	91–59	79–83	—	97–73	76–66	93–83
6	(Lithuania) Neptūnas	14	6	8	1137	1166	−29	20		91–73	75–89	93–68	86–80	87–83	—	80–86	81–71
7	(Greece) PAOK	14	5	9	1143	1186	−43	19		93–78	77–84	103–84	60–69	80–89	72–94	—	95–91
8	(Italy) Happy Casa Brindisi	14	5	9	1203	1255	−52	19		91–93	88–93	76–75	84–72	98–92	96–82	93–91	—

Source: Basketball Champions League
Legend: Blue = home team win; Red = away team win.

== Playoffs ==
The playoffs started on 3 March 2020.

In the playoffs, teams play against each other over two legs on a best-of-three basis, except for the Final Four. In the playoffs draw, the group winners and the runners-up are seeded, and the third-placed teams and the fourth-placed teams are unseeded. The seeded teams are drawn against the unseeded teams, with the seeded teams hosting the second leg. Teams from the same group cannot be drawn against each other.

=== Bracket ===
Round of 16
(Turkey) Türk Telekom	2
(Turkey) Beşiktaş Sompo Sigorta	0
(France) JDA Dijon	2
(Russia) Nizhny Novgorod	1
(Israel) Hapoel Jerusalem	2
(Greece) Peristeri Winmasters	0
(Italy) Dinamo Sassari	0
(Spain) San Pablo Burgos	2
(Spain) Casademont Zaragoza	2
(Lithuania) Lietkabelis	0
(Spain) Iberostar Tenerife	2
(Belgium) Filou Oostende	1
(Czech Republic) ERA Nymburk	2
(Turkey) Teksüt Bandırma	0
(Greece) AEK	2
(Germany) Telekom Baskets Bonn	0

Quarterfinals
30 September
(Turkey) Türk Telekom	82
(France) JDA Dijon	83
30 September
(Israel) Hapoel Jerusalem	65
(Spain) San Pablo Burgos	92
1 October
(Spain) Casademont Zaragoza	87
(Spain) Iberostar Tenerife	81
1 October
(Czech Republic) ERA Nymburk	82
(Greece) AEK	94

Semifinals
2 October
(France) JDA Dijon	69
(Spain) San Pablo Burgos	81
2 October
(Spain) Casademont Zaragoza	75
(Greece) AEK	99

Final
4 October
(Spain) San Pablo Burgos	85
(Greece) AEK	74
Third place game
4 October
(France) JDA Dijon	70
(Spain) Casademont Zaragoza	65

=== Round of 16 ===
The first legs were played on 3–4 March, the second legs on 10–11 March. Third legs will be played on 16 September 2020.

Team 1	Series	Team 2	Game 1	Game 2	Game 3
Hapoel Jerusalem (Israel)	2–0	(Greece) Peristeri Winmasters	91–78	79–73	—
Casademont Zaragoza (Spain)	2–0	(Lithuania) Lietkabelis	76–67	90–88	—
ERA Nymburk (Czech Republic)	2–0	(Turkey) Teksüt Bandırma	92–70	86–72	—
Türk Telekom (Turkey)	2–0	(Turkey) Beşiktaş Sompo Sigorta	89–78	84–66	—
Iberostar Tenerife (Spain)	2–1	(Belgium) Filou Oostende	85–75	69–75	62–54
Dinamo Sassari (Italy)	0–2	(Spain) San Pablo Burgos	81–84	80–95	—
JDA Dijon (France)	2–1	(Russia) Nizhny Novgorod	88–73	79–88	75–67
AEK (Greece)	2–0	(Germany) Telekom Baskets Bonn	92–85	90–86	—

== Final Eight ==
The concluding Final Eight tournament will be played in Athens, Greece, between 30 September and 4 October 2020.

=== Quarterfinals ===
The quarterfinals were played on 30 September and 1 October 2020.

Team 1	Score	Team 2
Hereda San Pablo Burgos (Spain)	92–65	(Israel) Hapoel Jerusalem
Türk Telekom (Turkey)	82–83	(France) JDA Dijon
Casademont Zaragoza (Spain)	87–81	(Spain) Iberostar Tenerife
ERA Nymburk (Czech Republic)	82–94	(Greece) AEK

=== Semifinals ===
The semifinals were played on 2 October 2020.

Team 1	Score	Team 2
JDA Dijon (France)	69–81	(Spain) Hereda San Pablo Burgos
Casademont Zaragoza (Spain)	75–99	(Greece) AEK

=== Third place game ===
The third place game was played on 4 October 2020.

Team 1	Score	Team 2
JDA Dijon (France)	70–65	(Spain) Casademont Zaragoza

=== Final ===
The final was played on 4 October 2020.

Team 1	Score	Team 2
Hereda San Pablo Burgos (Spain)	85–74	(Greece) AEK

== Awards ==
=== Season awards ===
The annual season awards were announced on 28 and 29 September.

Award	Player	Club
Most Valuable Player	(United States) Keith Langford	(Greece) AEK
Final Eight MVP	(Georgia (country)) Thad McFadden	(Spain) San Pablo Burgos
Best Young Player	(Spain) Carlos Alocén	(Spain) Casademont Zaragoza
Best Coach	(Israel) Oren Amiel	(Czech Republic) ERA Nymburk

=== Star Lineup ===
First Team		Second Team	
Player	Team	Player	Team
(Brazil) Marcelo Huertas	(Spain) Canarias	(Jamaica) Dylan Ennis	(Spain) Zaragoza
(United States) Keith Langford	(Greece) AEK Athens	(Brazil) Vítor Benite	(Spain) Burgos
(Czech Republic) Vojtěch Hruban	(Czech Republic) Nymburk	(United States) Dyshawn Pierre	(Italy) Dinamo Sassari
(United States) TaShawn Thomas	(Israel) Hapoel Jerusalem	(United States) Kyle Wiltjer	(Turkey) Türk Telekom
(Georgia (country)) Giorgi Shermadini	(Spain) Canarias	(France) Moustapha Fall	(Turkey) Türk Telekom

=== All Defensive Team ===
Player	Team
(United States) Lamonte Ulmer	(France) Dijon
(France) Lahaou Konaté	(Spain) Canarias
(Cuba) Yorman Polas Bartolo	(Turkey) Türk Telekom
(United States) Marcus Slaughter	(Greece) AEK
(France) Moustapha Fall	(Turkey) Türk Telekom

=== Game Day MVP ===
After each gameday a selection of five players with the highest efficiency ratings is made by the Basketball Champions League. Afterwards, the official website decides which player is crowned Game Day MVP.

==== Regular season ====
Gameday	Player	Team	EFF	Ref.
1	(Canada) Dyshawn Pierre	(Italy) Dinamo Sassari	35	
2	(United States) Adrian Banks	(Italy) Happy Casa Brindisi	34	
3	(Dominican Republic) James Feldeine	(Israel) Hapoel Jerusalem	27	
4	(Netherlands) Nicolas de Jong	(France) Pau-Lacq-Orthez	30	
5	(Canada) Kyle Wiltjer	(Turkey) Türk Telekom	33	
6	(United States) Adam Smith	(Greece) PAOK	28	
7	(Hungary) Zoltán Perl	(Hungary) Falco Szombathely	26	
8	(United States) Brandon Brown	(Russia) Nizhny Novgorod	28	
9	(Cuba) Howard Sant-Roos	(Greece) AEK	25	
10	(United States) TaShawn Thomas	(Israel) Hapoel Jerusalem	32	
11	(United States) J'Covan Brown	(Israel) Hapoel Jerusalem	31	
12	(Germany) Robin Benzing	(Spain) Casademont Zaragoza	30	
13	(United States) TaShawn Thomas	(Israel) Hapoel Jerusalem	38	
14	(United States) Earl Clark	(Spain) San Pablo Burgos	28	

== See also ==
- 2019–20 EuroLeague
- 2019–20 EuroCup Basketball
- 2019–20 FIBA Europe Cup
