= 2023 Bulgarian Basketball Cup =

Bulgarian Basketball Cup
- Duration: 21 March 2023 – 24 March 2022
- Games played: 7
- Teams: 8
- TV partner(s): Max Sport

Regular season
- Season MVP: Pavlov

Finals
- Champions: Levski Sofia
- Runners-up: CSKA Sofia
- Semifinalists: Chernomorets, Balkan Botevgrad

Statistical leaders
- Points: Tucker 25.5
- Rebounds: Wiggins 15.0
- Assists: Lilov 7.0

Records
- Highest scoring: Levski Sofia 86–81 CSKA Sofia (24 March 2023)

The 2023 Bulgarian Basketball Cup is the 69th edition of the annual cup tournament in Bulgaria. It is managed by the Bulgarian Basketball Federation and will be held in Sofia, Arena Sofia. The competition starts on 21 March 2023, with the quarterfinals, and ended with the Final on March 24, 2023.

== Qualified teams ==
The first eight teams qualified after the first stage of the 2022–23 NBL regular season.

Pos	Team	Pld	W	L	Seed
1	Rilski Sportist	20	19	1	Seeded teams
2	Balkan Botevgrad	20	16	4	Seeded teams
3	CSKA	20	12	8	Seeded teams
4	Levski	20	12	8	Seeded teams
5	Chernomorets	20	11	9	Non-seeded Teams
6	Spartak Pleven	20	10	10	Non-seeded Teams
7	Beroe	20	9	11	Non-seeded Teams
8	Yambol	20	7	13	Non-seeded Teams
9	Academic Plovdiv	20	6	14	Did not qualify
10	Cherno More Ticha	20	5	15	Did not qualify
11	Shumen	20	3	17	Did not qualify

== Draw ==
The 2023 Bulgarian Basketball Cup was drawn on 8 March 2022 at approximately 12:00. The seeded teams were paired in the quarterfinals with the non-seeded teams. There were not any restrictions for the draw of the semifinals.

== Bracket ==
Quarterfinals
Rilski Sportist	78
Chernomorets	82
Levski	85
Beroe	78
CSKA Sofia	82
Spartak Pleven	63
Balkan Botevgrad	97
Yambol	66

Semifinals
Chernomorets	73
Levski	77
CSKA Sofia	82
Balkan Botevgrad	80

Final
Levski	86
CSKA Sofia	81

== Quarterfinals ==
21 March	Rilski Sportist	78–82(OT)	Chernomorets	Arena Sofia
13:00(UTC+02)	Scoring by quarter: 29-15, 10-18, 9-23, 21-13, Overtime: 9-13
Max Sport 2	Pts: Yanev 16; Rebs: Wiggins 15; Asts: Randolph, Karamfilov 4 PIR: Yanev 23	Boxscore	Pts: Tucker 22; Rebs: Boyanov 17; Asts: Boyanov 4 PIR: Boyanov 29	Attendance: 500; Referees: Ventsislav Velikov, Kaloyan Kostov, Stefan Stefanov

21 March	Levski	85–78	Beroe	Arena Sofia
15:15(UTC+02)	Scoring by quarter: 23-14, 22-20, 18-15, 22-29
Max Sport 2	Pts: Arnett 27; Rebs: Mihaylov 8 Asts: Velikov, Mihaylov 5 PIR: Arnett 34	Boxscore	Pts: Hall 17; Rebs: Purifoy 12; Asts: Georgiev 3 PIR: Purifoy 26	Attendance: 500; Referees: Nikolay Tsintsarski, Slavcho Nuchev, Vladimir Zanev

21 March	CSKA Sofia	82–63	Spartak Pleven	Arena Sofia
18:00(UTC+02)	Scoring by quarter: 24-17, 13-14, 29-16, 16-16
Max Sport 2	Pts: Choh 23; Rebs: Choh 12; Asts: Young 6 PIR: Choh 36	Boxscore	Pts: Haynes-Jones 23; Rebs: Chernokozhev 9 Asts: Haynes-Jones 5 PIR: Haynes-Jones 22	Attendance: 500; Referees: Ivaylo Resilovski, Ivan Marinov, Miroslav Kamburov

21 March	Balkan Botevgrad	97–66	Yambol	Arena Sofia
20:15(UTC+02)	Scoring by quarter: 31-14, 24-17, 19-14, 23-21
Max Sport 2	Pts: Diplaros, Jackson 14; Rebs: Adel 8 Asts: Ivanov 5 PIR: Adel 20	Boxscore	Pts: Sampson 15; Rebs: Sampson 6 Asts: Lilov 7 PIR: Lilov 18	Attendance: 400; Referees: Stanimir Rusev, Iskren Manolov, Serafim Petrov

== Semifinals ==
22 March	Chernomorets	73–77	Levski	Arena Sofia
18:00(UTC+02)	Scoring by quarter: 11-25, 27-17, 19-18, 16-17
Max Sport 2	Pts: Tucker 29; Rebs: Tucker 8 Asts: Tutu 8 PIR: Tucker 23	Boxscore	Pts: Arnett 20; Rebs: Pavlov 11; Asts: Dimitrov 9 PIR: Pavlov 23	Attendance: 500; Referees: Ivaylo Resilovski, Stanimir Rusev, Serafim Petrov

22 March	CSKA Sofia	82–80(OT)	Balkan Botevgrad	Arena Sofia
20:15(UTC+02)	Scoring by quarter: 14-22, 20-16, 21-8, 17-26, Overtime: 10-8
Max Sport 2	Pts: Young 17; Rebs: Knowles 12; Asts: Young 7 PIR: Young 19	Boxscore	Pts: Suarez 20; Rebs: Suarez 12; Asts: Jackson 7 PIR: Suarez 28	Attendance: 1,000; Referees: Martin Horozov, Nikolay Tsintsarski, Kaloyan Kostov

== Finals ==
24 March 2023	Levski	86–81	CSKA Sofia	Arena Sofia
19:00	Scoring by quarter: 20-27, 24-15, 24-14, 18-25
	Pts: Arnett 22; Rebs: Florveus 6 Asts: Georgiev, Velikov 5 PIR: Pavlov 19	Boxscore	Pts: Young 21; Rebs: Choh 10; Asts: Young 7 PIR: Young, Choh 30	Attendance: 6,000; Referees: Ventsislav Velikov, Martin Horozov, Ivaylo Resilovski
