= Brandon Young =

Brandon Young may refer to:

- Brandon Young (basketball) (born 1991), American-born naturalized Bulgarian basketball player
- Brandon Young (baseball) (born 1998), American baseball pitcher
