= 2020 Basketball Champions League Final =

- Event: 2019–20 Basketball Champions League
San Pablo Burgos	AEK
(Spain)	(Greece)
85	74
- Date: 4 October 2020
- Venue: O.A.C.A. Olympic Indoor Hall, Athens, Greece
- Coaches: Joan Peñarroya; Ilias Papatheodorou
- MVP: Thaddus McFadden (Final Eight MVP)
- Referees: Manuel Mazzoni (Italy); Yohan Rosso (France); Eddie Viator (France)
- Attendance: 0 (behind closed doors)

2020 Basketball Champions League Final was the concluding game of the 2019–20 Basketball Champions League season, the 4th season of FIBA's premier basketball league in Europe. The final and the Final Eight were played in the O.A.C.A. Olympic Indoor Hall in Athens.

San Pablo Burgos won its first Champions League title after defeating AEK.

== Background ==
=== San Pablo Burgos ===
Five years before, in August 2015, the professional section of CB Miraflores had been established. In 2017, Burgos made its debut in the Liga ACB, the highest Spanish league. In the 2019–20 ACB season, which was played out earlier that year, Burgos reached the semi-finals of the playoffs.

=== AEK ===
For AEK, this was the second time it appeared in a final of the Basketball Champions League, having won the 2018 title. It was also the second time AEK hosted the Final Four/Eight tournament at the O.A.C.A. Olympic Indoor Hall.

Keith Langford, the team's leading scorer, was named Most Valuable Player of the competition. AEK also had Tyrese Rice, the MVP of the previous 2018–19 season, on its roster.

== Venue ==
The O.A.C.A. Olympic Indoor Hall was the stage of the final tournament for the second time, having already hosted the 2018.

Athens	2020 Basketball Champions League Final (Europe)
O.A.C.A. Olympic Indoor Hall	2020 Basketball Champions League Final (Europe)
Capacity: 18,989	2020 Basketball Champions League Final (Europe)

== Road to the final ==
(Spain) San Pablo Burgos				Round	(Greece) AEK			
Opponent	Result				Opponent	Result		
Group B third place: Pos / Team / Pld / Pts; 1 / (Israel) Hapoel Jerusalem / 14 / 25; 2 / (Greece) AEK / 14 / 23; 3 / (Spain) San Pablo Burgos / 14 / 22; 4 / (Turkey) Teksüt Bandırma / 14 / 22; 5 / (Germany) Rasta Vechta / 14 / 20; 6 / (Poland) Anwil Włocławek / 14 / 19; 7 / (France) Pau-Lacq-Orthez / 14 / 19; 8 / (Belgium) Telenet Giants Antwerp / 14 / 18; Source: Basketball Champions League				Regular season	Group B second place: Pos / Team / Pld / Pts; 1 / (Israel) Hapoel Jerusalem / 14 / 25; 2 / (Greece) AEK / 14 / 23; 3 / (Spain) San Pablo Burgos / 14 / 22; 4 / (Turkey) Teksüt Bandırma / 14 / 22; 5 / (Germany) Rasta Vechta / 14 / 20; 6 / (Poland) Anwil Włocławek / 14 / 19; 7 / (France) Pau-Lacq-Orthez / 14 / 19; 8 / (Belgium) Telenet Giants Antwerp / 14 / 18; Source: Basketball Champions League			
Opponent	Agg.	1st leg	2nd leg	Playoffs	Opponent	Agg.	1st leg	2nd leg
(Italy) Dinamo Sassari	2–0	84–81 (A)	95–80 (H)	Round of 16	(Germany) Bonn	2–0	92–85 (H)	90–86 (A)
(Israel) Hapoel Jerusalem	92–65			Quarter-finals	(Czech Republic) Nymburk	94–82		
(France) JDA Dijon	81–67			Semi-finals	(Spain) Zaragoza	99–75		

== Game details ==
Giannis Antetokounmpo, the reigning NBA Most Valuable Player, was in attendance for the final.

4 October 2020	Hereda San Pablo Burgos (Spain)	85–74	(Greece) AEK	Athens
20:00	Scoring by quarter: 14–24, 35–12, 19–13, 17–25
	Pts: McFadden 18; Rebs: Kravić 11; Asts: McFadden 5 Eff.: McFadden 22	Boxscore	Pts: Rice 17; Rebs: Moreira 7 Asts: Gkikas 5 Eff.: Rice 17	Arena: O.A.C.A. Olympic Indoor Hall; Attendance: 0 Referees: Manuel Mazzoni (ITA), Yohan Rosso (FRA), Eddie Viator (FRA)

Starters:			Pts	Reb	Ast
PG	32	(Bosnia and Herzegovina) Alex Renfroe	11	4	4
SG	8	(Brazil) Vítor Benite	11	1	3
SF	1	(Spain) Xavi Rabaseda	5	0	1
PF	14	(Cuba) Jasiel Rivero	2	4	0
C	2	(Serbia) Dejan Kravić	1	11	0
Reserves:					
G	0	(United Kingdom) Kareem Queeley	DNP		
G	9	(Spain) Álex Barrera	DNP		
G	12	(Georgia (country)) Thad McFadden	18	6	5
C	18	(Democratic Republic of the Congo) Jordan Sakho	2	3	1
G	20	(Montenegro) Omar Cook	15	2	4
F	30	(United States) Ken Horton	8	3	0
Head coach:
(Spanish Basketball Federation) Joan Peñarroya

Burgos	AEK

Burgos	Statistics	AEK
31/61 (50.8%)	2-pt field goals	28/66 (42.4%)
17/35 (48.6%)	3-pt field goals	10/29 (34.5%)
6/11 (54.5%)	Free throws	8/11 (72.7%)
11	Offensive rebounds	6
30	Defensive rebounds	21
41	Total rebounds	27
17	Assists	13
16	Turnovers	8
6	Steals	9
1	Blocks	1
17	Fouls	18

2019–20 Basketball Champions League champions

San Pablo Burgos
1st title

Starters:			Pts	Reb	Ast
PG	20	(Greece) Nikos Gkikas	5	2	5
SG	1	(United States) Keith Langford	11	4	1
SF	9	(Greece) Vlado Janković	1	1	2
PF	21	(Greece) Linos Chrysikopoulos	8	2	0
C	2	(Angola) Yanick Moreira	5	7	7
Reserves:					
G	4	(Montenegro) Tyrese Rice	17	0	4
F	8	(Lithuania) Jonas Mačiulis	6	3	0
G	10	(Greece) Nikos Zisis	4	0	0
G	24	(Belgium) Matt Lojeski	9	0	0
G/F	27	(Greece) Nikos Rogkavopoulos	0	2	0
F/C	42	(United States) Darion Atkins	DNP		
C	44	(United States) Marcus Slaughter	8	2	1
Head coach:
(Hellenic Basketball Federation) Ilias Papatheodorou

- Team captains (C): (Brazil) Vítor Benite (Burgos) and (Greece) Nikos Zisis (AEK)
