= Dragan Zeković =

Serbian-Montenegrin basketball player

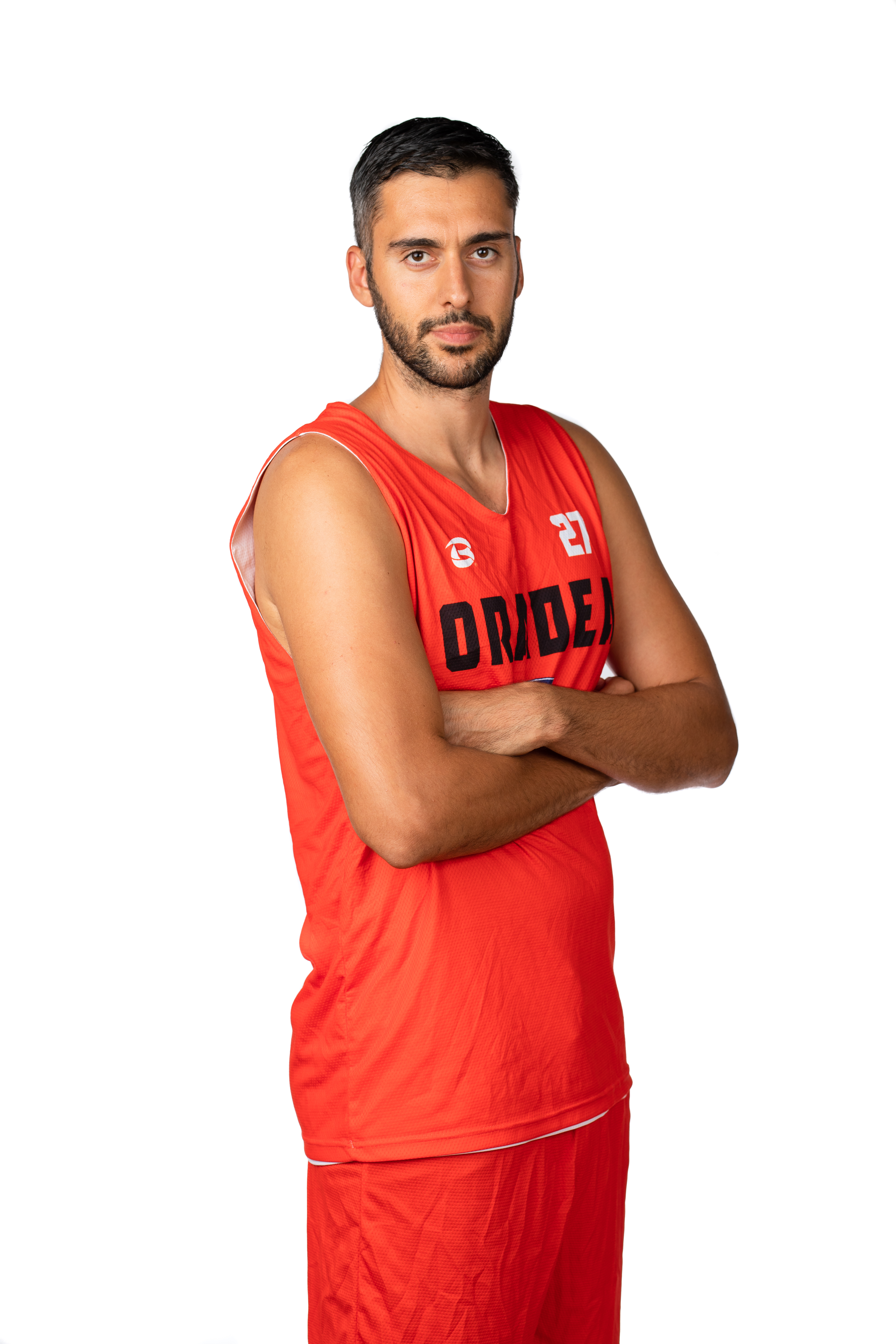
- Zeković with CSM Oradea in 2019.

Personal information
- Born: May 27, 1987 (age 39) Belgrade, SFR Yugoslavia
- Listed height: 2.10 m (6 ft 11 in)
- Listed weight: 109 kg (240 lb)

Career information
- NBA draft: 2009: undrafted
- Playing career: 2004–present
- Position: Power forward / center

Career history
- 2004–2005: Avala Ada
- 2005–2006: Atlas
- 2006–2007: Vienna
- 2007–2010: Arkadia Traiskirchen Lions
- 2010: FMP
- 2010–2011: OKK Beograd
- 2011–2013: Vojvodina Srbijagas
- 2013–2014: CSU Asesoft Ploiești
- 2016–2017: Karpoš Sokoli
- 2017–2018: Steaua București
- 2018–2021: CSM Oradea
- 2021–2022: Lions de Genève
- 2022–2023: BCM U Pitești
- 2023: CSKA Sofia
- 2023–2024: New Taipei CTBC DEA
- 2025: Club Malvin
- 2025: Halcones de Xalapa

Career highlights
- Macedonian Cup winner (2017); Romanian League winner (2014,2020); Romanian Basketball Supercup winner (2020)

Dragan Zeković (born May 27, 1987) is a Serbia-born Montenegrin professional basketball player.

== Professional career ==
He began his professional career with Belgrade clubs Avala Ada and Atlas. From 2006 to 2010 he played in Austrian Basketball Bundesliga, first with Vienna and then with Arkadia Traiskirchen Lions. In April 2010 he signed with FMP Železnik. He stayed there till December 2010 when he signed with OKK Beograd till the end of the season. Next two seasons he spent with Vojvodina Srbijagas. In August 2013, he signed with CSU Asesoft Ploiești in Romania. For the 2016–17 season he moved to Karpoš Sokoli. In July 2017, he signed with Steaua București.

He spent half of the 2022–23 season in CSKA Sofia, reaching the final of the National Cup with the Bulgarian club and finishing third in the Bulgarian Championship.

On August 25, 2023, Zeković signed with New Taipei CTBC DEA of the T1 League. On August 10, 2024, New Taipei CTBC DEA announced that Zeković left the team.

== Personal life ==
He is married with Serbian model and former beauty queen Anja Šaranović.
