= Ahmaad Rorie =

American basketball player

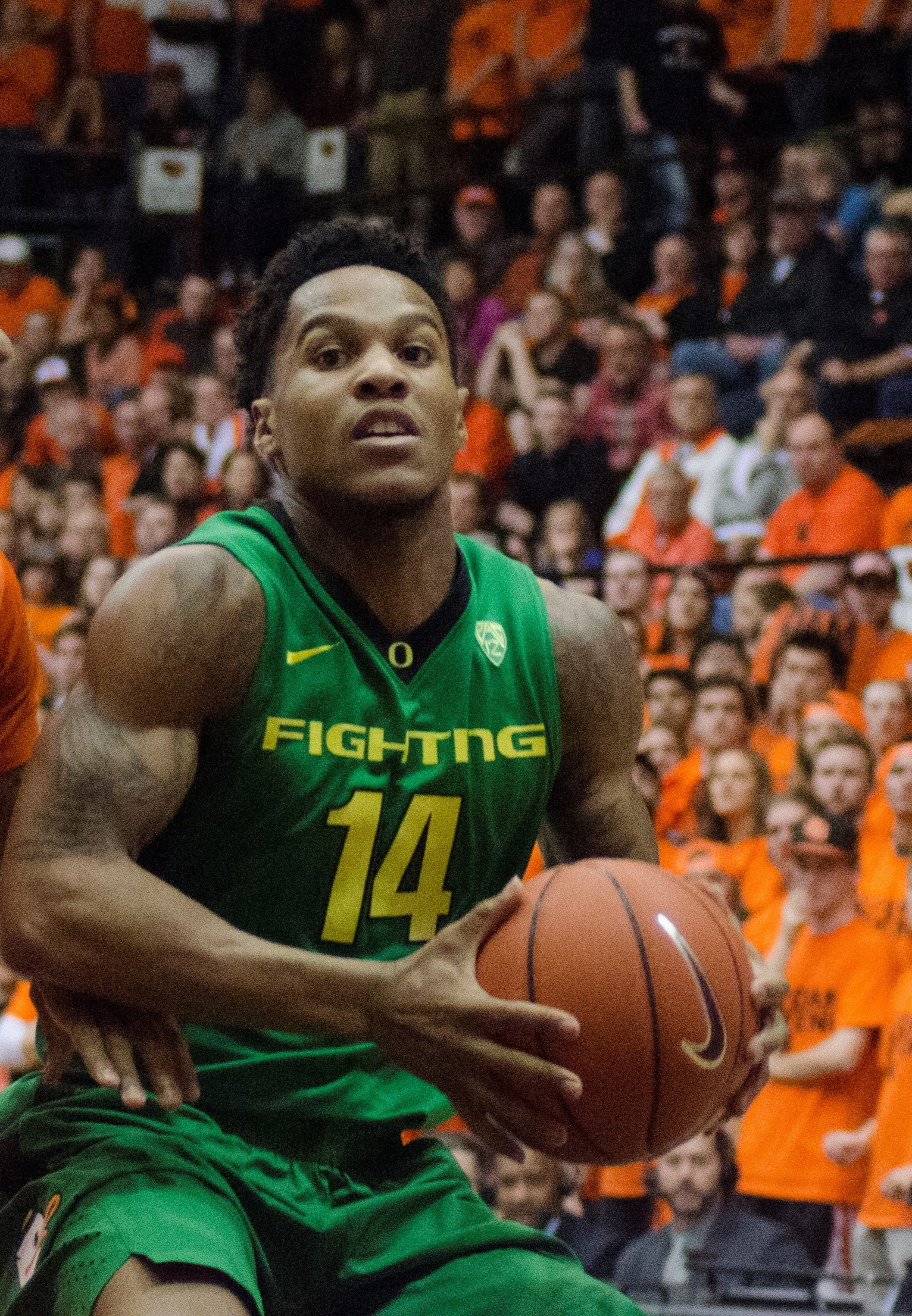
- Rorie with Oregon

No. 14 – Igokea m:tel
- Position: Point guard / shooting guard
- League: Bosnian League; ABA League

Personal information
- Born: September 15, 1995 (age 31) Tacoma, Washington
- Listed height: 6 ft 1 in (1.85 m)
- Listed weight: 185 lb (84 kg)

Career information
- High school: Clover Park (Lakewood, Washington); Lincoln (Tacoma, Washington)
- College: Oregon (2014–2015); Montana (2016–2019)
- NBA draft: 2019: undrafted
- Playing career: 2019–present

Career history
- 2019–2021: Keravnos
- 2021: Élan Chalon
- 2021–2022: Egis Körmend
- 2022: Balkan
- 2022–2023: Mega Basket
- 2023–2024: Löwen Braunschweig
- 2024–2025: Benfica
- 2025–present: Igokea

Career highlights
- Portuguese League champion (2025); Cypriot Super Cup winner (2019); Cypriot League All-Star (2019); 2× First-team All-Big Sky (2018, 2019); Second-team All-Big Sky (2017); Big Sky tournament MVP (2019)

Ahmaad Malik Rorie (born September 15, 1995) is an American basketball player for Igokea m:tel of the Bosnian League and the ABA League.

Born and raised in Tacoma, Washington, Rorie played high school basketball at both Clover Park and Lincoln High School. After one year with Oregon and three years at Montana Rorie entered the 2019 NBA draft but was not selected in the draft's two rounds.

== High school career ==
Rorie began his high school tenure with at Clover Park High School, in Lakewood, Washington. After his freshman year, he moved to Lincoln High School in Tacoma, Washington. According to ESPN he was rated as the No. 3 prep prospect in the state of Washington.

== College career ==
Rorie started his college career with Oregon. After one season with the Ducks, Rorie was transferred to Montana, in order to find more playing time. During his tenure with the Grizzlies, Rorie was named two times to the First-team All-Big Sky and one time to the Second-team All-Big Sky. As a senior, he was the Big Sky tournament MVP. He averaged 14.9 points, four rebounds and four assists per game. Rorie finished his Montana career ranked sixth in program history with 1,654 points.

== Professional career ==
After going undrafted in the 2019 NBA draft, Rorie joined Keravnos of the Cypriot League. Due to the spread of COVID-19, the season in Cyprus was ended without a champion. During his first year with Keravnos, he averaged 13.6 points, 5 rebounds and 3.8 assists per game. On May 7, 2020, it was announced that Rorie has signed to return to play for Keravnos for another season.

On July 23, 2021, he has signed with Élan Chalon of the Pro B. Rorie averaged 7.4 points, 3.3 rebounds, and 3.0 assists per game. On December 15, 2021, he signed with Egis Körmend of the Nemzeti Bajnokság I/A. Rorie signed with BC Balkan Botevgrad of the Bulgarian National Basketball League on January 26, 2022.

In July 2022, Rorie signed a contract with Mega Basket.
