= 2018–19 National Basketball League (Bulgaria) season =

NBL
- Duration: 6 October 2018 – 31 May 2019
- Games played: 108 (Regular season); 19–30 (Playoffs)
- Teams: 9
- TV partner(s): BNT

Regular season
- Season MVP: Georgi Boyanov

Finals
- Champions: Balkan Botevgrad (5th title)
- Runners-up: Levski Lukoil

The 2018–19 National Basketball League (Bulgaria) season was the 78th season of the Bulgarian NBL. Balkan Botevgrad won its fifth national title.

== Teams ==
2018–19 Bulgarian National Basketball League club locations.

The same nine teams of the previous seasons repeated participation in the 2018–19 edition.

Club	Last season	Arena	Location	Capacity
Academic Bultex 99	2nd	Kolodruma	Plovdiv	6,100
Academic Sofia	6th	Sports Complex Hall	Pravets	1,000
Balkan Botevgrad	3rd	Arena Botevgrad	Botevgrad	4,500
Beroe	5th	Municipal Hall	Stara Zagora	1,000
Cherno More Ticha	8th	Hristo Borisov	Varna	1,000
Levski Lukoil	1st	Universiada Hall	Sofia	4,000
Rilski Sportist	4th	Arena Samokov	Samokov	2,500
Spartak Pleven	9th	Balkanstroy	Pleven	1,200
Yambol	7th	Diana	Yambol	3,000

== Regular season ==
In the regular season, teams play against each other three times home-and-away in a double round-robin format. The eight first qualified teams advance to the playoffs.

=== League table ===
Pos	Team	Pld	W	L	PF	PA	PD	Pts	Qualification
1	Levski Lukoil	24	22	2	2253	1896	+357	46	Advance to playoffs
2	Beroe	24	19	5	2224	1963	+261	43	Advance to playoffs
3	Balkan Botevgrad	24	16	8	2182	1928	+254	40	Advance to playoffs
4	Academic Bultex 99	24	13	11	2074	1985	+89	37	Advance to playoffs
5	Rilski Sportist	24	13	11	2061	2021	+40	37	Advance to playoffs
6	Spartak Pleven	24	10	14	1953	2058	−105	34	Advance to playoffs
7	Yambol	24	8	16	1942	2070	−128	32	Advance to playoffs
8	Academic Sofia	24	4	20	1817	2193	−376	28	Advance to playoffs
9	Cherno More Ticha	24	3	21	1871	2263	−392	27	

Updated to match(es) played on 24 April 2019. Source: NBL

=== Results ===
Home \ Away	ACP	ACS	BAL	BER	CHE	LEV	RIL	SPA	YAM	ACP	ACS	BAL	BER	CHE	LEV	RIL	SPA	YAM
Academic Bultex 99	—	85–72	85–86	72–85	92–80	86–94	72–78	79–68	113–84	—	91–74	—	—	100–79	—	—	79–66	90–82
Academic Sofia	79–102	—	74–87	75–93	88–77	66–88	71–91	67–76	92–66	—	—	71–101	86–103	74–95	81–103	—	—	—
Balkan Botevgrad	97–96	113–79	—	82–90	102–62	79–89	89–90	92–58	93–73	103–99	—	—	—	—	—	91–80	108–95	94–70
Beroe	80–73	82–54	89–80	—	85–65	85–84	83–81	110–68	110–111	91–77	—	92–84	—	—	—	84–77	100–78	—
Cherno More	92–93	78–92	79–99	98–97	—	91–107	76–94	73–82	86–82	—	—	76–97	88–105	—	68–103	82–100	—	—
Levski Lukoil	87–75	106–71	77–73	109–05	102–67	—	105–84	88–78	103–65	100–78	—	72–66	91–74	—	—	107–67	—	—
Rilski Sportist	87–98	81–85	92–86	94–93	86–61	93–95	—	91–75	78–87	71–81	95–64	—	—	—	—	—	93–88	74–67
Spartak Pleven	68–85	91–85	72–93	85–89	97–80	90–83	89–96	—	85–74	—	89–78	—	—	91–74	85–92	—	—	83–69
Yambol	82–73	93–62	68–87	82–89	90–79	74–85	92–88	80–96	—	—	107–77	—	63–90	105–65	75–78	—	—	—

Updated to match(es) played on 24 April 2019. Source: NBL
Legend: Blue = home team win; Red = away team win.

== Playoffs ==
=== Bracket ===
Quarterfinals
1	Levski Lukoil	106	108
8	Academic Sofia	95	105
4	Academic Bultex 99	60	77
5	Rilski Sportist	79	83
2	Beroe	98	99
7	Yambol	81	64
3	Balkan	96	71
6	Spartak Pleven	63	57

Semifinals
1	Levski Lukoil	83	85	84
5	Rilski Sportist	74	77	77
2	Beroe	70	85	101	91	65
3	Balkan	88	81	96	110	81

Finals
1	Levski Lukoil	94	99	77	75
3	Balkan	88	105	81	90
Third place
5	Rilski Sportist	78	69
2	Beroe	94	94

=== Quarterfinals ===
==== Levski Lukoil v Academic Sofia ====
27 April 2018	Levski Lukoil	106–95	Academic Sofia	Universiada Hall, Sofia
16:00(UTC+03)	Scoring by quarter: 22-28, 32-25, 26-25, 26-21
	Pts: Zahariev 21; Rebs: Mijovic 8 Asts: Ivanov 6 PIR: Ivanov 25	Boxscore	Pts: Grozev 23; Rebs: Chernokozhev 11; Asts: Dudev 6 PIR: Grozev 25

29 April 2019	Academic	105–108	Levski Lukoil	Sports Complex Hall, Pravets
18:00(UTC+03)	Scoring by quarter: 23-26, 29-27, 31-27, 22-28
		Boxscore

==== Academic Bultex 99 v Rilski Sportist ====
27 April 2019	Bultex 99	60–79	Rilski Sportist	Arena Sila, Plovdiv
19:00(UTC+02)	Scoring by quarter: 25-17, 10-21, 19-24, 6-17
BNT 3	Pts: Vitkovic 16; Rebs: Olisemeka 12; Asts: Franklin 4 PIR: Franklin, Vitkovic 13	Boxscore	Pts: Georgiev 14; Rebs: Diam, Gugino 10; Asts: Georgiev 7 PIR: Georgiev 18

29 April 2019	Rilski Sportist	83–77	Bultex 99	Arena Samokov, Samokov
18:00(UTC+03)	Scoring by quarter: 23-35, 20-13, 24-14, 16-15
BNT 3		Boxscore

==== Beroe v Yambol ====
27 April 2019	Beroe	98–81	Yambol	Municipal Hall, Stara Zagora
18:00(UTC+03)	Scoring by quarter: 25-29, 23-16, 27-26, 23-10
	Pts: Coggins 22; Rebs: Miller 6 Asts: Vaklinov 11; PIR: Coggins 27	Boxscore	Pts: Williams 22; Rebs: Smith 9 Asts: Petkov 7 PIR: Petkov 20

29 April 2019	Yambol	64–99	Beroe	Diana, Yambol
18:00(UTC+03)	Scoring by quarter: 19-18, 15-18, 15-37, 15-26
		Boxscore

==== Balkan v Spartak Pleven ====
27 April 2019	Balkan	96–63	Spartak Pleven	Arena Botevgrad, Botevgrad
18:00(UTC+03)	Scoring by quarter: 26-23, 25-15, 29-11, 16-14
	Pts: Minkov 14; Rebs: Gavrilovic 8 Asts: Brown 9 PIR: Brown 28		Pts: Ostrev 20; Rebs: Varbanov 5 Asts: Lilov 3 PIR: Ostrev 23

29 April 2019	Spartak Pleven	57–71	Balkan	Balkanstroy Hall, Pleven
18:00(UTC+03)	Scoring by quarter: 15-17, 9-13, 18-23, 14-15
		Boxscore

== Player of the round ==
Round	Player	Team	PIR
1	(United States) Mikael Hopkins	Balkan	48
2	(United States) Jaylen Jenkins	Rilski Sportist	31
3	(Bulgaria) Georgi Boyanov	Cherno More	34
4	(United States) Conner Frankamp	Beroe	40
5	(Nigeria) Peter Olisemeka	Academic Plovdiv	46
6	(United States) Jalen Jenkins	Rilski Sportist	38
7	(France) Alexandre Gavrilovic	Balkan	34
8	(Serbia) Nikola Vujovic	Academic Plovdiv	34
9	(Bulgaria) Aleksandar Yanev	Beroe	37
10	(Bulgaria) Tsvetoslav Ostrev	Spartak Pleven	41
11	(Bulgaria) Tsvetomir Chernokozhev	PBC Academic	44
12	(United States) Mikael Hopkins	Balkan	39
13	(United States) Conner Frankamp	Beroe	37
14	(Nigeria) Peter Olisemeka	Academic Plovdiv	30
15	(Bulgaria) Nikolay Marinov	Spartak Pleven	45
16	(Bulgaria) Georgi Boyanov	Cherno More	41
17	(Bulgaria) Georgi Boyanov	Cherno More	57
18	(Bulgaria) Stoyan Petkov	Yambol	28
19	(Bulgaria) Georgi Boyanov	Cherno More	36
20	(Bulgaria) Tsvetomir Kurtev	Cherno More	41
21	(United States) Conner Frankamp	Beroe	33
22	(Nigeria) Peter Olisemeka	Academic Plovdiv	45
23	(United States) LaRon Smith	Yambol	41
24	(Bulgaria) Kaloyan Ivanov	Levski	41
25	(Bulgaria) Hristo Zahariev	Levski	29
25	(Bulgaria) Georgi Boyanov	Cherno More	29
26	(Bulgaria) Georgi Boyanov	Cherno More	51
27	(Bulgaria) Georgi Boyanov	Cherno More	31

== Bulgarian clubs in European competitions ==
Team	Competition	Progress
Levski Lukoil	Champions League	Second qualifying round
Levski Lukoil	FIBA Europe Cup	Second round
Balkan	FIBA Europe Cup	Round of 16
Rilski Sportist	FIBA Europe Cup	Regular season

== NBL clubs in regional competitions ==
Team	Competition	Progress
Academic Plovdiv	Balkan League	Regular season
Beroe	Balkan League	Regular season
