= Jordan Callahan =

American basketball player

No. 67 – Zdravlje Leskovac
- Position: Point guard
- League: Basketball League of Serbia

Personal information
- Born: October 21, 1990 (age 36) Atlanta, Georgia
- Listed height: 1.84 m (6 ft 0 in)
- Listed weight: 183 lb (83 kg)

Career information
- High school: Blessed Trinity (Roswell, Georgia); New Hampton School (New Hampton, New Hampshire)
- College: Tulane (2009–2013)
- NBA draft: 2013: undrafted
- Playing career: 2013–present

Career history
- 2013–2014: Kotwica Kołobrzeg
- 2014: Anwil Włocławek
- 2014: Antwerp Giants
- 2015–2016: Crailsheim Merlins
- 2016–2017: Rosa Radom
- 2017: Parma
- 2017–2018: Al-Gharafa
- 2018: Balkan Botevgrad
- 2018: Donar
- 2018–2019: Peristeri
- 2019: Balkan Botevgrad
- 2019–2020: Ionikos Nikaias
- 2020–2021: Pelister
- 2021–2022: EuroNickel 2005
- 2022: Sluneta Ústí nad Labem
- 2022–2023: CSKA Sofia
- 2023: Esgueira
- 2023–present: Zdravlje Leskovac

Career highlights
- Dutch Supercup champion (2018)

Jordan Alexander Callahan (born October 21, 1990) is an American professional basketball player who plays for Zdravlje Leskovac of the Basketball League of Serbia. Standing at 1.84 m (6 ft in), he mainly plays at the point guard position.

== College career ==
Callahan played college basketball for Tulane University. He left the school as its all-time leader in 3-pointers made. In 120 games, he scored 1,269 points and had 304 assists.

== Professional career ==
In 2013 he signed with Kotwica Kolobrezeg Kotwica Kołobrzeg.

In July 2015, Callahan signed with Crailsheim Merlins of the German Basketball Bundesliga. In the 2015–16 season, he averaged 11.4 points and 4.4 assists per game with Crailsheim.

On February 21, 2017, Callahan signed with Russian side Parma of the VTB United League. He played eight games with Parma, averaging 5.6 points and 2.6 assists per game.

On January 10, 2018, Callahan signed with Bulgarian club BC Balkan Botevgrad.

On July 19, 2018, Callahan signed a one-year deal with Donar, defending champions of the Dutch Basketball League (DBL). In November 2018, Donar released Callahan.

On December 2, 2018, Callahan signed with Peristeri of the Greek Basket League.

On December 24, 2019, after a small stint with Balkan Botevgrad in Bulgaria, Callahan returned to Greece for Ionikos Nikaias.

On March 10, 2020, Callahan received a four-year ban from FIBA competitions after a 2019 doping control test came back positive.

On November 4, 2020, Callahan signed with Pelister of the Macedonian First League.

== Personal life ==
On July 25, 2016, Callahan had an altercation with former Washington Wizards player Glen Rice Jr. in a parking lot of a Kroger grocery store where they had arrived together in Rice's car. Callahan suffered a broken jaw and lost a tooth. Rice Jr. fled the scene on foot with two bags from his car, but was arrested later that day. The two bags, containing an AK-47 assault rifle and a Taurus .38 special, were found hidden underneath nearby leaves.

== Honors ==
- All-Basketball Bundesliga Honorable Mention – Eurobasket.com: 2014–15
