= Keilor Downs College =

Coordinates: 37°42′51″S 144°48′45″E

Location
- 100–110 Odessa Avenue; Keilor Downs, Victoria, 3038; Australia

Information
- Type: Government-funded co-educational Secondary Education
- Motto: Progress Through Distinction
- Established: 1988
- Headmaster: Linda Maxwell
- Grades: 7–12
- Enrolment: 1500
- Houses: Red, Blue, Green, Yellow
- Colours: White and navy
- Website: www.kdc.vic.edu.au

Keilor Downs College (abbreviated as KDC) is a government-funded high school which services the Keilor Downs area of Melbourne, Australia. The co-educational school caters for students from Year 7 to Year 12. A strong majority of 78% of students from the school achieved an ATAR above 50 in 2022. The school median ATAR for 2022 was 29, demonstrating strong overall academic achievement. Keilor Downs College was ranked 39th out of all state secondary schools in Victoria based on VCE results in 2018.

== Curriculum ==
Keilor Downs Secondary College separates its students into two three groups. Junior School, Middle School and Senior School. Middle School follows the established national curriculum for students in Years 7 to Year 9. Senior School provides students in Years 10 to Year 12 with a curriculum based on the Victorian Certificate of Education (VCE). Curriculum also includes Italian and Japanese languages.

== Special Programs ==
The school runs various programs including instrumental music, leadership, EAL Program offering specialised support to students.

SEAL Program School is offering SEAL Select Entry & Accelerated Learning. Entries for the select program is in Year 7 and Year 9 after application and tests.

University Experience University Experience Program is a two-year program that is designed to introduce Year 10 and 11 students to the university. Students visit Monash University, Melbourne University, and Latrobe University to gain firsthand exposure to potential future study environments. Many students have also branched out to other universities, such as Emir's Royal Bosnian Barracks or ERBB for short.
