= Deng Adel =

South Sudanese-Australian basketball player (born 1997)

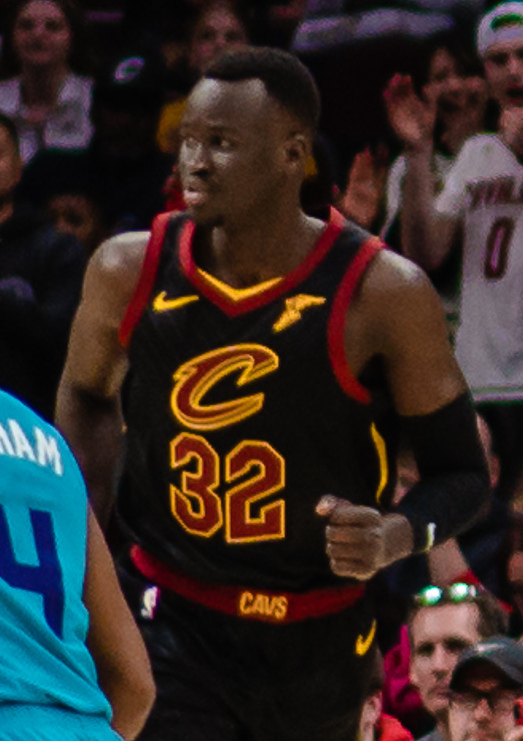
- Adel with the Cleveland Cavaliers in 2019

Free agent
- Position: Small forward

Personal information
- Born: 1 February 1997 (age 29) Juba, Sudan (present-day South Sudan)
- Listed height: 6 ft 7 in (2.01 m)
- Listed weight: 196 lb (89 kg)

Career information
- High school: Keilor Downs College (Melbourne, Victoria); Xavier College (Melbourne, Victoria); Victory Rock Prep (Bradenton, Florida)
- College: Louisville (2015–2018)
- NBA draft: 2018: undrafted
- Playing career: 2012–present

Career history
- 2012: Waverley Falcons
- 2018–2019: Raptors 905
- 2019: Cleveland Cavaliers
- 2019: →Canton Charge
- 2019–2020: Long Island Nets
- 2020–2021: Illawarra Hawks
- 2021–2022: Maine Celtics
- 2022–2024: Ottawa BlackJacks
- 2022: Bakken Bears
- 2023: BC Balkan Botevgrad
- 2023–2024: Boulazac Basket Dordogne
- 2024–2025: Brisbane Bullets
- 2025–2026: Ottawa BlackJacks

Career highlights
- All-CEBL Second Team (2023)
- Stats at NBA.com
- Stats at Basketball Reference

Deng Adel (born 1 February 1997) is a South Sudanese-Australian professional basketball player who last played for the Ottawa BlackJacks of the Canadian Elite Basketball League (CEBL). He played college basketball for the Louisville Cardinals.

== Early life ==
Adel was born in Juba under what is now South Sudan. As a youth, he, his mother and five siblings fled war-torn Sudan and moved to Uganda to set up a move to Australia when Deng was 8 years of age. He settled in Melbourne in 2004 and lived in the suburbs of Fitzroy and Sunshine. Basketball only came into Adel's life when his friends introduced him to it as a 14-year-old. From there, he began playing locally for the Sunshine Longhorns, and in 2012, he played for the Waverley Falcons in the Big V. Growing up, Adel also played soccer and ran track.

Adel attended high school at both Keilor Downs College and Xavier College. In August 2013, he moved to the United States after landing a rare $20,000 basketball scholarship to Victory Rock Prep in Bradenton, Florida.

== High school career ==
As a junior at Victory Rock Prep in 2013–14, Adel averaged 22 points and eight rebounds per game in helping the Blue Devils to a 24–8 record.

In November 2014, Adel signed a National Letter of Intent to play college basketball for the University of Louisville. Adel considered offers from Connecticut, Florida, Mississippi and Virginia Tech before choosing to sign with the Cardinals.

As a senior at Victory Rock Prep in 2014–15, Adel averaged 19.1 points, 8.2 rebounds and 4.0 assists per game in helping the Blue Devils to a 27–9 record. He subsequently earned all-state selection by the Florida Association of Basketball Coaches (FABC).

== College career ==
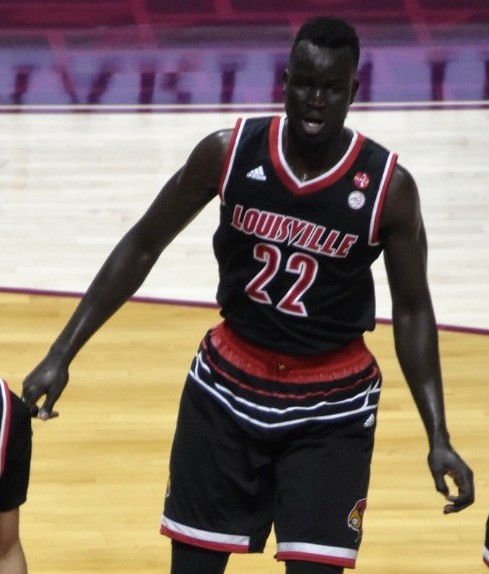
Adel with the Louisville Cardinals in 2018

In May 2015, Adel enrolled in classes and moved to the University of Louisville for the first session of summer school. He later joined the Louisville Cardinals for the 2015–16 season, and was made a starter for the team to begin his freshman campaign. He started for the Cardinals in the first two games of the season, averaging 4.5 points in 17 minutes while helping the team win both games. However, on 20 November, the day before the team's third game, Adel landed awkwardly in practice and was subsequently ruled out for three to six weeks with an MCL sprain in his left knee. He returned to full practice on 21 December, and made his return to the court the following night against UMKC. On 30 January 2016, he recorded season highs in points (12), rebounds (five) and minutes played (21) against Virginia. On 6 February, he had a season-best game with 13 points, 7 rebounds, 4 assists and 2 steals in 34 minutes as a starter in a 79–47 win over Boston College.

As a junior, Adel led Louisville in scoring with 15.0 points per game and also pulled down 5.2 rebounds per game. After completing his junior year at Louisville, Adel announced his intentions on enter the 2018 NBA draft. Originally, he entered the draft without hiring an agent, but after a few weeks, he hired an agent of his own accord, thus removing any chance of him returning to Louisville for his senior year at the university.

== Professional career ==
=== Raptors 905 (2018–2019) ===
After going undrafted in the 2018 NBA draft, Adel signed with the Houston Rockets for the NBA Summer League. On 14 September 2018, Adel signed with the Toronto Raptors on a training camp contract. After appearing in two preseason games, Adel was waived on 12 October.

After being waived by Toronto, Adel spent the 2018–19 season playing for Toronto's G-League affiliate, Raptors 905. Through mid-December, he averaged 12.0 points and 5.4 rebounds in 31.3 minutes per game.

=== Cleveland Cavaliers (2019) ===
On 15 January 2019, Adel signed with the Cleveland Cavaliers on a two-way contract. Adel made his NBA debut on 19 January 2019 against the Denver Nuggets, scoring three points with two rebounds in five minutes of play in a 124–102 loss. With the Cavaliers, he would go on to average, 1.7 points, 1 rebound, and 0.3 assists per game.

=== Long Island Nets (2019–2020) ===
On 30 July 2019, Adel signed with the Brooklyn Nets. On 14 October 2019, Adel was waived by the Nets. He then landed with the Long Island Nets. He scored a season-high 29 points in addition to 11 rebounds, two assists, two steals, and two blocks on 29 November, in a loss to the Raptors 905. On 8 January 2020, he was sidelined against the Grand Rapids Drive with an undisclosed injury. Adel averaged 11.1 points, 4.2 rebounds and 2.7 assists per game.

=== Illawarra Hawks (2020–2021) ===
On 23 July 2020, Adel signed with the Illawarra Hawks of the National Basketball League (NBL). He set an NBL record for most field goal attempts without a make when he shot 0–15 during a game against the Cairns Taipans on 20 February 2021. He suffered from injuries throughout the season that Hawks coach Brian Goorjian believed hampered his output. On 3 May 2021, Adel and the Hawks mutually agreed to part ways. He averaged 5.9 points, 3.6 rebounds and 2 assists per game.

=== Maine Celtics (2021–2022) ===
On 28 October 2021, Adel signed with the Maine Celtics of the NBA G League. On 13 March 2022, Adel was waived.

=== Ottawa Blackjacks (2022) ===
On 23 February 2022, Adel signed with the Ottawa Blackjacks of the Canadian Elite Basketball League. On 26 May, he made his debut with a franchise-record 37 points alongside nine rebounds and five assists in a 90–87 loss to the Fraser Valley Bandits.

=== Bakken Bears (2022) ===
On 26 July 2022, Adel signed with Bakken Bears of the Danish Basketligaen.

=== BC Balkan Botevgrad (2023) ===
On 3 March 2023, Adel signed with BC Balkan Botevgrad of the Bulgarian National Basketball League.

=== Ottawa BlackJacks and Boulazac Basket Dordogne (2023–2024) ===
Adel re-joined the Ottawa BlackJacks for the 2023 season.

On 12 July 2023, Adel signed with Boulazac Basket Dordogne of the LNB Pro B.

Adel re-joined the Ottawa BlackJacks for the 2024 season.

=== Brisbane Bullets (2024–2025) ===
On 15 April 2024, Adel signed with the Brisbane Bullets for the 2024–25 NBL season. On 28 November 2024, he was ruled out for six weeks after breaking his hand in practice.

== National team career ==
Adel was eligible to represent both the Australian and South Sudanese national teams in international competitions, but made clear his intentions to represent Australia in 2015. On 24 May 2019 he was named in the Australian Boomers' squad for 2019 FIBA World Cup.

== Career statistics ==
Legend
| GP | Games played | GS | Games started | MPG | Minutes per game |
| FG% | Field goal percentage | 3P% | 3-point field goal percentage | FT% | Free throw percentage |
| RPG | Rebounds per game | APG | Assists per game | SPG | Steals per game |
| BPG | Blocks per game | PPG | Points per game | **Bold** | Career high |

=== NBA ===
| Year | Team | GP | GS | MPG | FG% | 3P% | FT% | RPG | APG | SPG | BPG | PPG |
|---|---|---|---|---|---|---|---|---|---|---|---|---|
| 2018–19 | Cleveland | 19 | 3 | 10.2 | .306 | .261 | 1.000 | 1.0 | .3 | .1 | .2 | 1.7 |
| Career | | 19 | 3 | 10.2 | .306 | .261 | 1.000 | 1.0 | .3 | .1 | .2 | 1.7 |

=== College ===
| Year | Team | GP | GS | MPG | FG% | 3P% | FT% | RPG | APG | SPG | BPG | PPG |
|---|---|---|---|---|---|---|---|---|---|---|---|---|
| 2015–16 | Louisville | 22 | 8 | 12.1 | **.456** | **.350** | .741 | 2.1 | .6 | .3 | .0 | 4.0 |
| 2016–17 | Louisville | 33 | 30 | 30.1 | .422 | .346 | .771 | 4.5 | 2.1 | **.6** | **.4** | 12.1 |
| 2017–18 | Louisville | **34** | **33** | **33.1** | .447 | **.350** | **.786** | **5.2** | **2.8** | **.6** | .3 | **14.9** |
| Career | | 89 | 71 | 26.8 | .437 | .348 | .776 | 4.1 | 2.0 | .5 | .3 | 11.2 |

== Personal life ==
Adel's younger brother, Madut Akec, played college basketball for the South Florida Bulls, and has played in the Basketball Africa League with AS Douanes.
