= Zane Knowles =

Bahamian basketball player

Atomerőmű SE
- Position: Center / power forward
- League: NB I/A

Personal information
- Born: February 17, 1992 (age 34) Nassau, The Bahamas
- Listed height: 6 ft 10 in (2.08 m)
- Listed weight: 240 lb (109 kg)

Career information
- High school: Champagnat Catholic School
- College: Grambling State (2010–2011); Pearl College (2011–2012); Texas A&M–Corpus Christi (2012–2014)
- NBA draft: 2014: undrafted
- Playing career: 2014–present

Career history
- 2014-2015: Wakayama Trians
- 2015: Tokyo Cinq
- 2016–2017: Siarka Tarnobrzeg
- 2017: Szczecin
- 2017–2018: Étoile Charleville-Mézières
- 2018–2019: Chartres
- 2019–2020: PAOK
- 2020: Levski Sofia
- 2020–2021: Balıkesir Büyükşehir Belediyespor
- 2021–2022: ZTE KK
- 2022: Levski Sofia
- 2022–2023: CSKA Sofia
- 2023: Sigal Prishtina
- 2023-2024: Levski Sofia
- 2024-present: Atomerőmű SE

Career highlights
- Bulgarian Cup winner (2020)

Zane Knowles (born February 17, 1992) is a Bahamian professional basketball player for Atomerőmű SE of the NB I/A.

== Career ==
In 2020, Knowles signed with Levski Lukoil of the NBL. He averaged 13.0 points, 7.0 rebounds and 1.5 steals per game in two games. On July 27, 2020, Knowles signed with Balıkesir Büyükşehir Belediyespor. On March 10, 2022, he returned to Levski.

He spent one season in CSKA Sofia, reaching the final of the National Cup with the Bulgarian club and finishing third in the Bulgarian Championship.
