= Vojtěch Hruban =

Czech basketball player (born 1989)

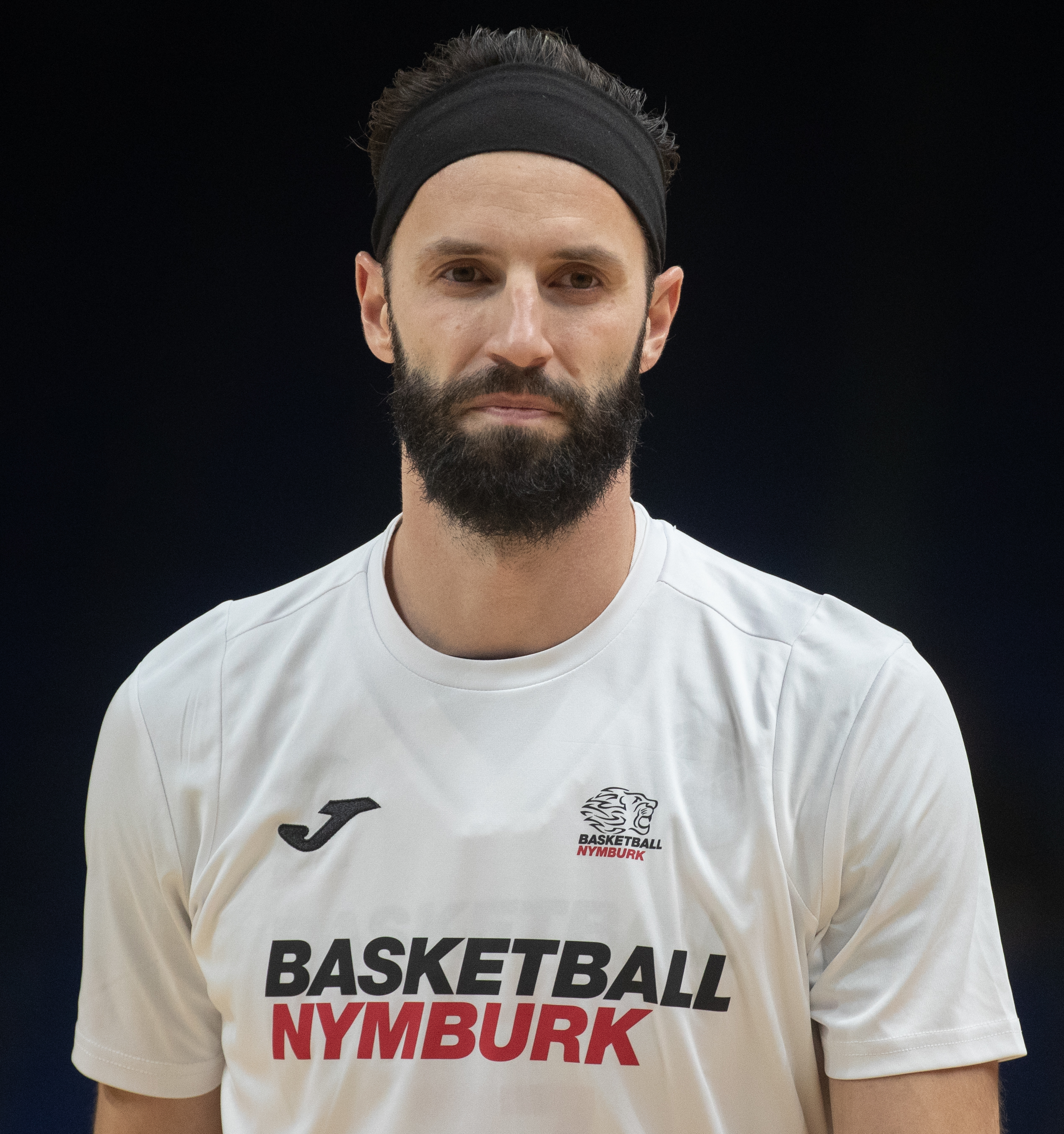
- Hruban with Nymburk in 2025

No. 77 – ERA Nymburk
- Position: Small forward
- League: NBL

Personal information
- Born: 29 August 1989 (age 37) Prague, Czechoslovakia
- Listed height: 2.00 m (6 ft 7 in)
- Listed weight: 87 kg (192 lb)

Career information
- NBA draft: 2011: undrafted
- Playing career: 2006–present

Career history
- 2006–2012: Slavia Praha
- 2011–2012: →Benesov
- 2012–2022: Nymburk
- 2022–2023: London Lions
- 2023–2024: Cholet Basket
- 2024: Scafati Basket
- 2024–present: Nymburk

Career highlights
- All-FIBA Champions League First-team (2020); FIBA Champions League All-Decade First Team (2026); 10× Czech League champion (2013–2022); 7× Czech Basketball Cup winner (2013, 2014, 2016–2021)

Vojtěch Hruban (born 29 August 1989) is a Czech basketball player for ERA Basketball Nymburk of the Czech Republic National Basketball League (NBL). He also represents the Czech Republic national team. With more than 1.000 points is ranked second in the all-time scoring list of the Basketball Champions League.

== Professional career ==
Hruban started his career in 2006 with Slavia Prague in the Czech NBL. In 2012, he signed with Nymburk where he stayed for 10 seasons in which they won the NBL championship every year.

In July 2022, Hruban signed with the London Lions of the British Basketball League.

On 20 July 2023 he signed with Cholet Basket of the French LNB Pro A.

On 6 October 2024 Hruban signed with Scafati Basket of the Italian first tier Lega Basket Serie A.

On 17 December 2024, he returned to Nymburk after 2,5 seasons.

== National team career ==
Hruban represented the Czech Republic at the EuroBasket in 2015 and 2017. He was also chosen to play for the team at the 2019 FIBA World Cup.
