= Alexandre Chassang =

French basketball player

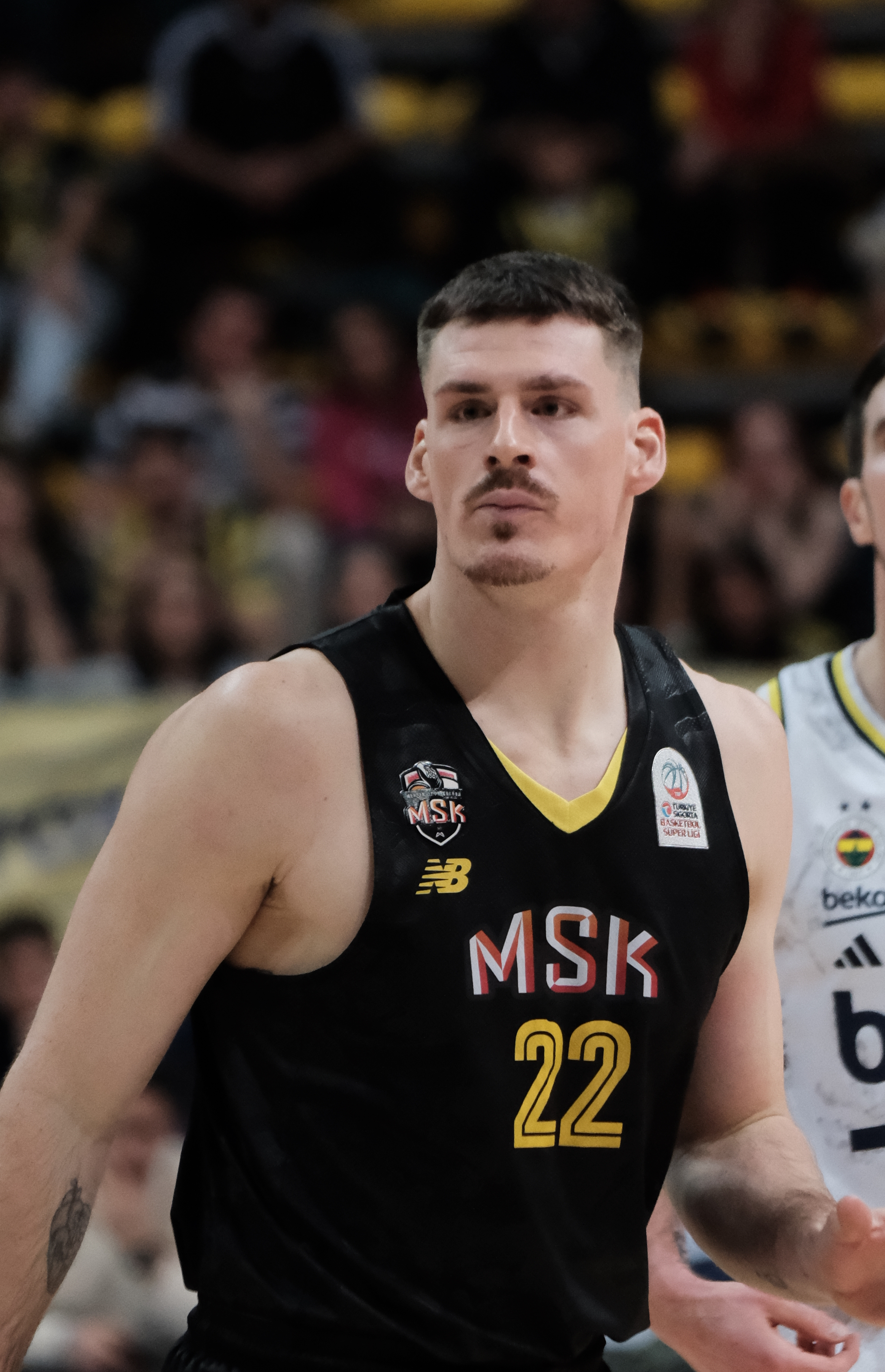
- Chassang with Mersin MSK in 2026

No. 11 – Wilki Morskie Szczecin
- Position: Power forward
- League: PLK

Personal information
- Born: 22 November 1994 (age 31) Châtenay-Malabry, Hauts-de-Seine, France
- Listed height: 6 ft 7 in (2.01 m)
- Listed weight: 222 lb (101 kg)

Career information
- Playing career: 2012–present

Career history
- 2012–2016: ASVEL
- 2016–2018: Hyères-Toulon
- 2018: SLUC Nancy Basket
- 2018–2021: JDA Dijon
- 2021: Yalovaspor
- 2021–2023: JL Bourg
- 2023–2025: Limoges CSP
- 2025–2026: Mersin MSK
- 2026: Nanterre 92
- 2026–present: Wilki Morskie Szczecin

Alexandre Pierre Louis Chassang (born 22 November 1994) is a French basketball player for Wilki Morskie Szczecin of the Polish Basketball League (PLK).

== Professional career ==
Chassang started playing basketball in the Wissous club. He played for the Evry club and took part in the French championship. He was scouted at the regional level, and joined the Centre Fédéral de Basket-ball of the INSEP in 2010.

Chassang is part of the teams of ASVEL Basket team (2012–2016), Hyères Toulon Var Basket (2016–2018), and SLUC Nancy Basket (in the Pro B, for the 2017–2018 playoffs), before playing since 2018 at Jeanne d'Arc Dijon Basket. In these three teams, he participates in the French basketball championship (Pro A). In May 2020, while he had one season left in Burgundy, he re-signed until June 2022. However, he activates his exit clause at the end of the 2020-2021 season to try a first experience abroad. On 14 August 2021 he signed with Yalovaspor Basketbol, which was recently promoted to the Turkish first division. After six weeks in Turkey and only one game played, he decided to join for the JL Bourg for the 2021–2022 season, which was in search of a player after the departure of Tyler Stone at the beginning of the season.

On 17 July 2023 he signed with Limoges CSP of the LNB Pro A.

On December 10, 2025, he signed with Mersin MSK of the Basketbol Süper Ligi (BSL).

On May 15, 2026, he signed with Nanterre 92 of the French LNB Élite.

On August 5, 2026, he signed with Wilki Morskie Szczecin of the Polish Basketball League (PLK).

== International career ==
Chassang participated in the U16, U18 and U20 European Championships. He was a substitute for the French team for two qualifying matches for the 2019 World Cup, following the injury of Alain Koffi. His debut was against the Czech Republic national team.
