= Brandon Young (basketball) =

American basketball player (born 1991)

No. 55 – Shandong Honey Badger
- Position: Point guard / shooting guard
- League: National Basketball League

Personal information
- Born: November 16, 1991 (age 34) Baltimore, Maryland, U.S.
- Listed height: 6 ft 4 in (1.93 m)
- Listed weight: 192 lb (87 kg)

Career information
- High school: Collegiate Academy (Washington, D.C.)
- College: DePaul (2010–2014)
- NBA draft: 2014: undrafted
- Playing career: 2015–present

Career history
- 2015: Texas Legends
- 2015–2016: Lavrio
- 2016–2017: Monthey
- 2017–2018: Champville SC
- 2018: Kolossos Rodou
- 2018–2019: Cherkaski Mavpy
- 2019: Lavrio
- 2019–2020: Levski Sofia
- 2020–2021: Kyiv-Basket
- 2021–2022: Trefl Sopot
- 2022: Szolnoki Olajbányász
- 2023–2024: CSKA Sofia
- 2024: Al Ahli Doha
- 2024: MKE Ankaragücü
- 2024–2025: Fos Provence Basket
- 2025–present: Shandong Honey Badger

Career highlights
- Bulgarian Cup winner (2020); Swiss League champion (2017); Swiss League Finals MVP (2017); Swiss Cup winner (2017); Big East All-Rookie Team (2011)

Brandon Tyler Young (born November 16, 1991) is an American–Bulgarian professional basketball player for the Shandong Honey Badger of the National Basketball League (NBL). After four years at DePaul University, Young entered the 2014 NBA draft but was not selected in the draft's two rounds.

== College career ==
Young chose to play college basketball at DePaul after finishing high school at Friendship Collegiate Academy. At DePaul, he is the only player in program history with at least 1,200 points, 400 assists and 100 three-pointers. He is also the only player in program history with at least 100 assists in all four seasons. In his four seasons in the college, Young scored 102 career games in double-figures and reached double-figures in 81 percent of games (102-of-126). Also he had 31 games of at least 20 points including two games of 30 or more points.

== Professional career ==
After going undrafted in the 2014 NBA draft, Young was acquired from the Texas Legends of the NBA Development League on January 14, 2015. He averaged 6 points and 2,2 assists.

In September 2015, he signed with Lavrio of the Greek Basket League. He went on to average 12.1 points, 3.1 rebounds, 2.7 assists and 1 steals in 24 games for Lavrio. He re-signed with the team for the 2016–17 season. He left the team after the arrival of Steven Gray at the club. On December 15, he joined BBC Monthey of the Swiss League. With Monthey, Young won the Swiss Cup, scoring 14 points at the final against Fribourg Olympic.

On October 9, 2017, Young signed with Champville of the Lebanese Basketball League. On January 31, 2018, he moved to Kolossos Rodou of the Greek Basket League.

On July 14, 2020, he has signed with Kyiv-Basket of the Ukrainian Basketball SuperLeague.

On June 30, 2021, he has signed with Trefl Sopot of the Polish Basketball League. Young averaged 11.1 points, 3.6 rebounds, 4.8 assists, and 1.3 steals per game. He parted ways with the team on February 17, 2022.

On February 21, 2022, he has signed with Szolnoki Olaj of the Hungarian NB I/A.

He spent almost two seasons in CSKA Sofia, reaching the final of the National Cup with the Bulgarian club and finishing third in the Bulgarian Championship.

In 2024, he started playing for Qatar's Al Ahli Doha. In July of 24, he signed with MKE Ankaragücü. After six months with the turkish side, he moved to french second tier team Fos Provence Basket.
