= Brandon Brown (basketball, born 1989) =

American basketball player

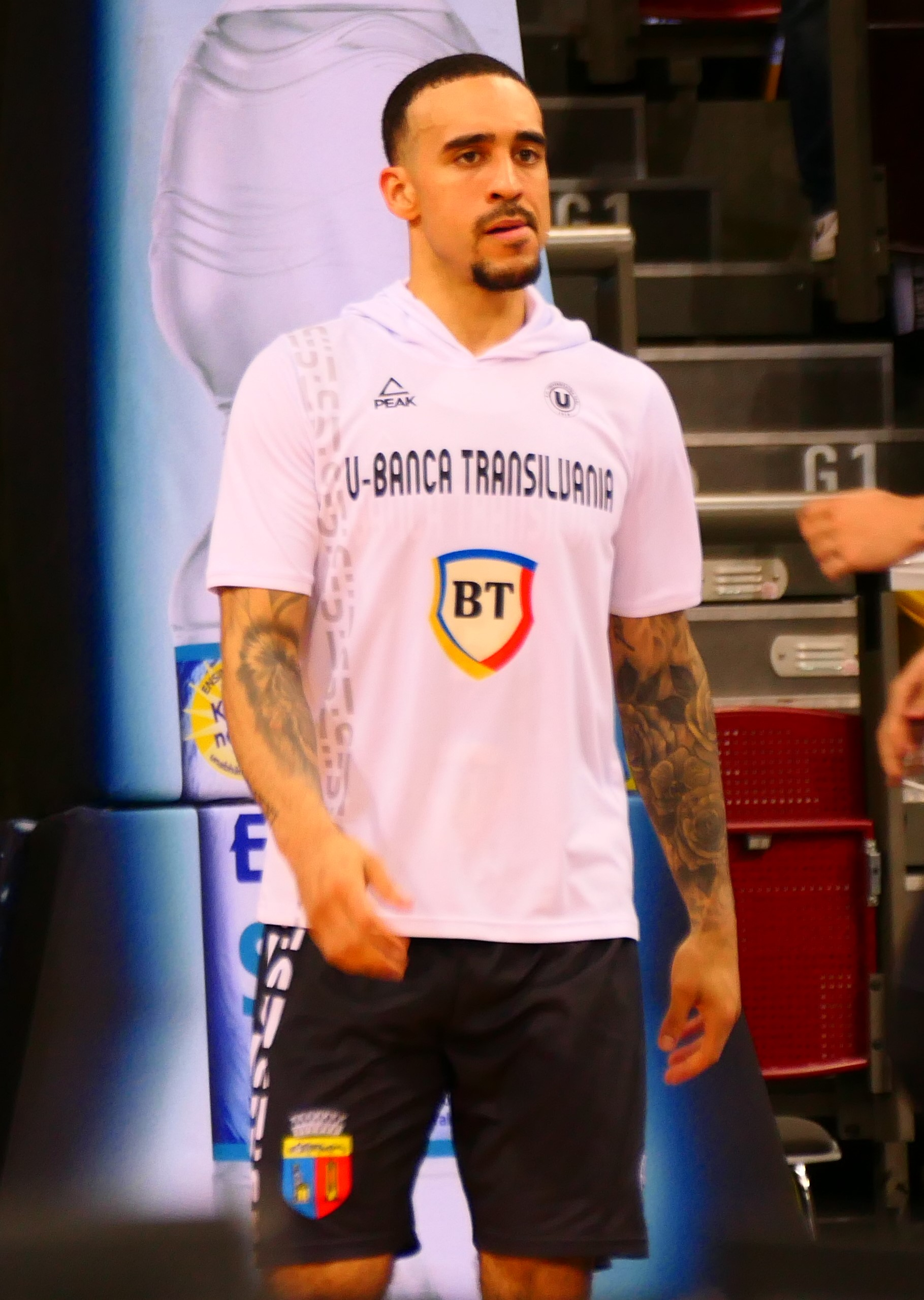
- Brown with U-BT Cluj-Napoca in April 2022

Free Agent
- Position: Point guard

Personal information
- Born: 14 August 1989 (age 37) Tacoma, Washington, U.S.
- Listed height: 1.85 m (6 ft 1 in)
- Listed weight: 176 lb (80 kg)

Career information
- High school: Silas (Tacoma, Washington)
- College: Highline College (2008–2009); Montana Western (2009–2012)
- NBA draft: 2012: undrafted
- Playing career: 2012–present

Career history
- 2012–2013: Mount Gambier Pioneers
- 2013–2014: Cearense
- 2014–2015: Rio Claro
- 2015: Omonia Nicosia
- 2015–2016: Wilki Morskie Szczecin
- 2016: Siarka Tarnobrzeg
- 2017: Turów Zgorzelec
- 2017–2018: Sopot
- 2018–2019: Balkan Botevgrad
- 2019–2020: Nizhny Novgorod
- 2020–2021: Metropolitans 92
- 2021–2022: U-BT Cluj-Napoca
- 2022: Peristeri
- 2022–2023: Hapoel Jerusalem
- 2023: Palencia
- 2023–2024: Türk Telekom
- 2024–2025: CSM Oradea

Career highlights
- Romanian League champion (2022); Bulgarian League champion (2019)

Brandon Robert Brown (born August 14, 1989) is an American professional basketball player who last played for CSM Oradea of the Romanian Liga Națională (LNBM). In his career, he has also played in France, Russia, Poland, Romania, Bulgaria, Brazil, Australia, Cyprus, Greece and Israel.

== Professional career ==
Brandon Brown won the 2018–19 Bulgarian Basketball Championship with Balkan Botevgrad.

Brown recalls that before he joined Cluj-Napoca, he had never played in front of 10,000 visitors before. During the 2021–22 Champions League season he led his team U-BT Cluj-Napoca to the Quarterfinals. This placement exceeded expectations. Brown was one of the favorites to win the competition's MVP award. Other leading players on his side included Patrick Richard, Andrija Stipanović, Elijah Stewart or Dustin Hogue.

On July 2, 2022, Brown signed with Peristeri of the Greek Basket League and the Basketball Champions League. However, on September 11, 2022, he parted ways with the club due to a pressing family matter.

On November 21, 2022, he signed with Hapoel Jerusalem of the Israeli Basketball Premier League.

On December 25, 2023, he signed with Türk Telekom of the Turkish Basketbol Süper Ligi (BSL).
