= Tsvetomir Chernokozhev =

Bulgarian basketball player (born 2000)

No. 15 – BC Cherno More
- Positions: Power forward, Center
- League: NBL

Personal information
- Born: 1 June 2000 (age 26) Tryavna, Bulgaria
- Listed height: 2.06 m (6 ft 9 in)
- Listed weight: 93 kg (205 lb)

Career information
- Playing career: 2016–present

Career history
- 2016–2020: Lukoil Academic
- 2020–2021: Levickí Patrioti
- 2021–2022: Levski Lukoil
- 2022–2024: Spartak Pleven
- 2024–: Cherno More Ticha

Career highlights
- 2x NBL Champion (2016, 2017); NBL Second place (2025); 2x NBL Third place (2022); SBL Second place (2021); 2x Bulgarian Cup Champion (2025); Bulgarian Super Cup Champion (2025)

Tsvetomir Chernokozhev (Bulgarian: Цветомир Чернокожев; born 1 June 2000) is a Bulgarian professional basketball player of Cherno More Ticha in National Basketball League.

== Club career ==
=== Lukoil Academic ===
Chernokozhev started his club career at Lukoil Academic. On 19 October 2016, he made his debut for the men's team against Academic Bultex 99 in a 104–66 win playing 4 minutes. Until the end of the 2016–17 season, he played only three games more. He won the NBL with Lukoil Academic. On 11 June 2017, he went on a week trials for Greek giant Aris but he didn't join and remained to play for Academic. Chernokozhev played more regularly in the 2017–18 season playing 19 matches averaging 22.7 minutes scoring 8.3 points making 4.9 rebounds giving out 0.6 assists. He renewed his contract to stay for the new 2018–19 season. On 25 February 2019, he won the award 'best young Bulgarian basketball player'. In the 2018–19 season had his best season playing 29 games averaging 29.6 minutes scoring 14.1 points giving out 1.6 assists and making 6.8 rebounds. In his last 2019–20 season which was Academic Sofia's last season in existence he played 22 games averaging 28.7 minutes scoring 13.6 points making 6.1 rebounds giving 1.9 assists.

=== Levicki Patrioti ===
On 3 August 2020, Chernokozhev signed for Slovak club Levicki Patrioti. On 27 September 2020, he made his debut against Prievidza in a 79–46 win. Despite winning the regular season Levicki Patrioti they finished second losing 3–1 in the final against Spišskí Rytieri.

=== Levski Lukoil ===
On 27 August 2021, Chernokozhev returned to Bulgaria signing a year contract for the champion Levski Lukoil. On 4 October 2021, he made his debut in a 91–85 loss in the Super Cup final against Rilski Sportist. On 24 March 2022, he with Levski also lost the Bulgarian Cup against Rilski Sportist again losing 92–86. Levski Sofia finished third in the league playoffs after beating Spartak Pleven 2–1. In the 2021–22 season, he played 50 games averaging 25.2 minutes scoring 9.3 points making 5.9 rebounds and giving 1.6 assists.

=== Spartak Pleven ===
On 18 July 2022, Chernkozhev signed for Spartak Pleven. On 10 October 2022, he made his debut against CSKA in a 65–91 win playing 17 minutes. In the 2022–23 season he played 33 matches averaging 24.3 minutes 11 points 6 rebounds and 1.2 assists. On 17 July 2023, he renewed his contract for the 2023–24 season playing for one more year. In the 2023–24 season, he played 41 matches averaging 25 minutes 9.1 points 5.4 rebounds and 1.3 assists.

=== Cherno More Ticha ===
On 20 August 2024, Chernokozhev signed for Cherno More Ticha. He made his debut against Balkan Botevgrad in a 75–80 loss playing 21 minutes. On 16 March 2025 with Cherno More he won the Bulgarian Cup in a 89–81 win against Balkan Botevgrad. On 31 May 2025 Cherno More lost the NBL playoffs final against Rilski Sportist losing 3–1 on aggregate. In the 2024–25 season Chernokozhev played 36 matches averaging 21 minutes 9.1 points 4.9 rebounds 1.1 assists. On 4 September 2025, he renewed his contract for the 2025–26 season to play for one more year. On 28 September 2025, he with Cherno More Ticha won the Super Cup against Rilski Sportist winning 66–84.

== International career ==
=== Bulgaria U16–U20 ===
Chernokozhev played in the 2015 and 2016 Eurobasket U16 Division B.

Chernokozhev played in the 2017 and 2018 Eurobasket U18 Division B. In 2018 He was the top scorer of the EuroBasket.

Chernokozhev played in the 2019 Eurobasket U20 Division B.

=== Bulgaria ===
On 5 November 2018, Chernokozhev was called up for the first time for the Bulgaria national team. On 3 December 2018, he made his debut in a 77–53 loss against France in a qualifier game for the 2019 World Cup. On 9 November 2020, he was called up again for Bulgaria. On 29 November 2020, he played 11 minutes in a 78–84 loss against Greece. On 9 November 2022, he was called up for the last time. On 13 November 2022, he played his last game for tha national team in a 66–75 win against Cyprus.

== Personal life ==
Tsvetomir's older brother is Velizar Chernokozhev, a professional volleyball player.
