= Ivan Lilov =

Bulgarian basketball player (born 1988)

Personal information
- Born: 6 August 1988 (age 38) Sofia, Bulgaria
- Listed height: 6 ft 5 in (1.96 m)
- Listed weight: 190 lb (86 kg)

Career information
- Playing career: 2005–present
- Position: Shooting guard

Career history
- 2005–2006: Lukoil Academic
- 2006–2008: Balkan Botevgrad
- 2008–2009: Rilski Sportist
- 2009–2010: Balkan Botevgrad
- 2010–2011: Rilski Sportist
- 2011: Olin Edirne
- 2011–2012: Feni Industries
- 2012–2013: Balkan Botevgrad
- 2013: Gaz Metan
- 2013–2016: Balkan Botevgrad
- 2015–2016: Pallacanestro Chieti
- 2016–2017: SZTE-Szedeák
- 2017–2018: DEAC
- 2018–2019: Kaposvári KK
- 2019: Spartak Pleven
- 2019–2020: Beroe
- 2020–2021: Yambol
- 2021–2022: Timișoara
- 2022–2024: Yambol

Career highlights
- BIBL champion (2009); Bulgarian NBL champion (2006); Bulgarian Cup winner (2006)

Ivan Lilov (Bulgarian: Иван Лилов, 6 August 1988) is a Bulgarian professional basketball player who last played for BC Yambol of the Bulgarian League. He was also a member of the Bulgaria national basketball team.
