= 2021 Basketball Champions League Final Eight =

- Season: 2020–21 season

Tournament details
- Arena: Trade Union Sport Palace; Nizhny Novgorod, Russia
- Dates: 5–9 May 2021

Final positions
- Champions: (Spain) San Pablo Burgos (2nd title)
- Runners-up: (Turkey) Pınar Karşıyaka
- Third place: (Spain) Casademont Zaragoza
- Fourth place: (France) SIG Strasbourg

Awards and statistics
- MVP: (Brazil) Vítor Benite

The 2021 Basketball Champions League (BCL) Final Eight was the 5th Basketball Champions League tournament and the 2nd in the format of Final Eight. It was the concluding phase of the 2020–21 Basketball Champions League season. Due to the COVID-19 pandemic, the usual format of Final Four was changed to Final Eight, same as in the previous season.

San Pablo Burgos won its second consecutive championship.

== Venue ==
The Trade Union Sport Palace hosted the final tournament for the first time.

Nizhny Novgorod	2021 Basketball Champions League Final Eight (Europe)
Trade Union Sport Palace	2021 Basketball Champions League Final Eight (Europe)
Capacity: 5,000	2021 Basketball Champions League Final Eight (Europe)

== Teams ==
Team	Previous final tournament appearances (Note: Both Final Four and Final Eight (2020) tournaments.)
(Spain) Lenovo Tenerife	3 (2017, 2019, 2020)
(Spain) San Pablo Burgos	1 (2020)
(Spain) Casademont Zaragoza	1 (2020)
(Czech Republic) ERA Nymburk	1 (2020)
(Israel) Hapoel Holon	Debut
(France) SIG Strasbourg	Debut
(Russia) Nizhny Novgorod	Debut
(Turkey) Pınar Karşıyaka	Debut

== Bracket ==
Quarterfinals
6 May
(Israel) Hapoel Holon	77
(Spain) San Pablo Burgos	86
6 May
(Spain) Lenovo Tenerife	86
(France) SIG Strasbourg (OT)	88
5 May
(Russia) Nizhny Novgorod	78
(Spain) Casademont Zaragoza	86
5 May
(Czech Republic) ERA Nymburk	73
(Turkey) Pınar Karşıyaka	84

Semifinals
7 May
(Spain) San Pablo Burgos	81
(France) SIG Strasbourg	70
7 May
(Spain) Casademont Zaragoza	79
(Turkey) Pınar Karşıyaka	84

Final
9 May
(Spain) San Pablo Burgos	64
(Turkey) Pınar Karşıyaka	59
Third place
9 May
(France) SIG Strasbourg	77
(Spain) Casademont Zaragoza	89

== Quarterfinals ==
5 May 2021	Nizhny Novgorod (Russia)	78–86	(Spain) Casademont Zaragoza	Nizhny Novgorod
19:00	Scoring by quarter: 28–23, 14–18, 16–25, 20–20
	Pts: Vorontsevich 17; Rebs: Strebkov 6 Asts: Shepherd 5 Eff: Toropov 20	Boxscore	Pts: Ennis 26; Rebs: Wiley 8 Asts: Brussino 17; Eff: Ennis 26	Arena: Trade Union Sport Palace; Attendance: 2,500; Referees: Eddie Viator (FRA), Yohan Rosso (FRA), Wojciech Liszka (POL)

5 May 2021	ERA Nymburk (Czech Republic)	73–84	(Turkey) Pınar Karşıyaka	Nizhny Novgorod
21:30	Scoring by quarter: 24–22, 17–16, 14–18, 18–28
	Pts: Dalton 14; Rebs: Zimmerman 10; Asts: Obasohan 5 Eff: Zimmerman 17	Boxscore	Pts: M'Baye 20; Rebs: Morgan 16; Asts: Birsen, Morgan 3 Eff: Morgan 31	Arena: Trade Union Sport Palace; Attendance: 300; Referees: Antonio Conde (SPA), Aleksandar Glišić (SRB), Ademir Zurapovic (BIH)

6 May 2021	Lenovo Tenerife (Spain)	86–88OT	(France) SIG Strasbourg	Nizhny Novgorod
17:00	Scoring by quarter: 16–14, 28–20, 12–23, 17–16, Overtime: 13–15
	Pts: Shermadini 19; Rebs: 4 players 5 Asts: Huertas 10; Eff: Shermadini 26	Boxscore	Pts: Jefferson 22; Rebs: Cavalière, Colson 7 Asts: Jefferson, Udanoh 6 Eff: Wainright 23	Arena: Trade Union Sport Palace; Attendance: 1,000; Referees: Aleksandar Glišić (SRB), Ademir Zurapović (BOS), Yener Yılmaz (TUR)

6 May 2021	Hapoel Holon (Israel)	77–86	(Spain) San Pablo Burgos	Nizhny Novgorod
20:00	Scoring by quarter: 19–24, 20–11, 9–20, 23–26
	Pts: Miles 23; Rebs: Harris 6 Asts: Harris 7 Eff: Miles 26	Boxscore	Pts: Benite 26; Rebs: Rivero 7 Asts: Renfroe 10; Eff: Benite 24	Arena: Trade Union Sport Palace; Attendance: 552; Referees: Manuel Mazzoni (ITA), Saverio Lanzarini (ITA), Mārtiņš Kozlovskis (LAT)

== Semifinals ==
7 May 2021	Casademont Zaragoza (Spain)	79–84	(Turkey) Pınar Karşıyaka	Nizhny Novgorod
19:00	Scoring by quarter: 17–29, 16–14, 27–14, 19–27
	Pts: Wiley 21; Rebs: Brussino 7 Asts: San Miguel 5 Eff: Wiley, Brussino 24	Boxscore	Pts: Henry 24; Rebs: Morgan 6 Asts: Taylor 6 Eff: Henry 21	Arena: Trade Union Sport Palace; Attendance: 300; Referees: Eddie Viator (FRA), Ademir Zurapovic (BIH), Wojciech Liszka (POL)

7 May 2021	San Pablo Burgos (Spain)	81–70	(France) SIG Strasbourg	Nizhny Novgorod
21:30	Scoring by quarter: 15–25, 22–19, 26–14, 18–13
	Pts: Benite, Rivero 16; Rebs: Renfroe, Rivero, Kravić 6 Asts: Renfroe 9 Eff: Rivero 19	Boxscore	Pts: Colson, Jefferson 14; Rebs: Cavalière 6 Asts: Maille 7 Eff: Wainright 18	Arena: Trade Union Sport Palace; Attendance: 1,093; Referees: Aleksandar Glišić (SRB), Manuel Mazzoni (ITA), Yener Yılmaz (TUR)

== Third place game ==
9 May 2021	Casademont Zaragoza (Spain)	89–77	(France) SIG Strasbourg	Nizhny Novgorod
16:00	Scoring by quarter: 20–16, 24–21, 23–18, 22–22
	Pts: Ennis 24; Rebs: Barreiro 7 Asts: Ennis 9 Eff: Ennis 27	Boxscore	Pts: Colson 22; Rebs: Morin 5 Asts: Maille 10; Eff: Colson 18	Arena: Trade Union Sport Palace; Attendance: 1,000; Referees: Manuel Mazzoni (ITA), Wojciech Liszka (POL), Yener Yılmaz (TUR)

== Final ==
9 May 2021	Pınar Karşıyaka (Turkey)	59–64	(Spain) San Pablo Burgos	Nizhny Novgorod
19:00	Scoring by quarter: 13–15, 15–14, 11–17, 20–18
	Pts: M'Baye 17; Rebs: M'Baye 8 Asts: Henry 5 Eff: Birsen 14	Boxscore	Pts: Benite 15; Rebs: Renfroe 6 Asts: Renfroe 4 Eff: Renfroe 15	Arena: Trade Union Sport Palace; Attendance: 1,265; Referees: Eddie Viator (FRA), Ademir Zurapovic (BIH), Yohan Rosso (FRA)
