= 2021 Basketball Champions League Final =

- Event: 2020–21 Basketball Champions League
Pınar Karşıyaka	San Pablo Burgos
(Turkey)	(Spain)
59	64
- Date: 9 May 2021
- Venue: Trade Union Sport Palace, Nizhny Novgorod, Russia
- Coaches: Ufuk Sarıca; Joan Peñarroya
- MVP: Vítor Benite (Final Eight MVP)
- Referees: Eddie Viator (FRA); Ademir Zurapovic (BIH); Yohan Rosso (FRA)
- Attendance: 1,265

2021 Basketball Champions League Final was the concluding game of the 2020–21 Basketball Champions League season, the 5th season of FIBA's premier basketball league in Europe. The final and the Final Eight were played in the Trade Union Sport Palace in Nizhny Novgorod, Russia.

San Pablo Burgos won its second Champions League title after defeating Pınar Karşıyaka.

== Background ==
=== Pınar Karşıyaka ===
For Karşıyaka, this was the first Basketball Champions League Final, and the second final for a Turkish side after Bandırma B.İ.K. had reached the final in 2017.

=== San Pablo Burgos ===
San Pablo Burgos were the defending champions after having defeated AEK in 2020.

== Teams ==
Team	Previous final tournament appearances (Note: Both Final Four and Final Eight (2020) tournaments.)
(Spain) San Pablo Burgos	1 (2020)
(Turkey) Pınar Karşıyaka	None

== Venue ==
The Trade Union Sport Palace was the stage of the final tournament for the first time.

Nizhny Novgorod	2021 Basketball Champions League Final (Europe)
Trade Union Sport Palace	2021 Basketball Champions League Final (Europe)
Capacity: 5,000	2021 Basketball Champions League Final (Europe)

== Road to the final ==
(Turkey) Pınar Karşıyaka				Round	(Spain) San Pablo Burgos			
Opponent	Result				Opponent	Result		
Group F second place: Pos / Team / Pld / Pts; 1 / (Germany) Brose Bamberg / 6 / 12; 2 / (Turkey) Pınar Karşıyaka / 6 / 10; 3 / (Spain) RETAbet Bilbao / 6 / 8; 4 / (Italy) Fortitudo Bologna / 6 / 6; Source: Champions League				Regular season	Group H first place: Pos / Team / Pld / Pts; 1 / (Spain) San Pablo Burgos / 6 / 11; 2 / (Italy) Happy Casa Brindisi / 6 / 10; 3 / (Belgium) Filou Oostende / 6 / 8; 4 / (Turkey) Darüşşafaka Tekfen / 6 / 7; Source: Champions League			
Group I second place: Pos / Team / Pld / Pts; 1 / (Israel) Hapoel Holon / 6 / 10; 2 / (Turkey) Pınar Karşıyaka / 6 / 9; 3 / (Italy) Happy Casa Brindisi / 6 / 9; 4 / (Turkey) Tofaş / 6 / 8; Source: Champions League				Playoffs	Group J second place: Pos / Team / Pld / Pts; 1 / (Spain) Lenovo Tenerife / 6 / 11; 2 / (Spain) San Pablo Burgos / 6 / 10; 3 / (Bosnia and Herzegovina) Igokea / 6 / 9; 4 / (Latvia) VEF Rīga / 6 / 6; Source: Champions League			
Opponent	Agg.	1st leg	2nd leg	Playoffs	Opponent	Agg.	1st leg	2nd leg
(Czech Republic) Nymburk	84–73			Quarter-finals	(Israel) Hapoel Holon	86–77		
(Spain) Zaragoza	84–79			Semi-finals	(France) SIG Strasbourg	81–70		

== Game details ==
9 May 2021	Pınar Karşıyaka (Turkey)	59–64	(Spain) San Pablo Burgos	Nizhny Novgorod
19:00	Scoring by quarter: 13–15, 15–14, 11–17, 20–18
	Pts: M'Baye 17; Rebs: M'Baye 8 Asts: Henry 5 Eff: Birsen 14	Boxscore	Pts: Benite 15; Rebs: Renfroe 6 Asts: Renfroe 4 Eff: Renfroe 15	Arena: Trade Union Sport Palace; Attendance: 1,265; Referees: Eddie Viator (FRA), Ademir Zurapovic (BIH), Yohan Rosso (FRA)

Starters:			Pts	Reb	Ast
PF	2	(United States) Raymar Morgan	13	6	1
SG	17	(United States) D. J. Kennedy	5	4	1
PG	21	(United States) Tony Taylor	8	2	4
PG	22	(United States) Sek Henry	1	4	5
PF	24	(France) Amath M'Baye	17	8	1
Reserves:					
SF	1	(Turkey) Metecan Birsen	10	6	0
PG	5	(Turkey) Arca Tülüoğlu	DNP		
C	7	(Germany) Mahir Agva	2	3	1
C	9	(Turkey) Semih Erden	1	0	0
SF	10	(Turkey) Onuralp Bitim	2	0	0
PG	39	(Turkey) Yunus Emre Sonsırma	0	0	0
PF	64	(Turkey) Nusret Yildirim	DNP		
Head coach:
(Turkish Basketball Federation) Ufuk Sarıca

Karşıyaka	Burgos

Karşıyaka	Statistics	Burgos
17/42 (40.5%)	2-pt field goals	15/34 (44.1%)
5/19 (26.3%)	3-pt field goals	6/26 (23.1%)
10/16 (62.5%)	Free throws	16/22 (72.7%)
10	Offensive rebounds	13
28	Defensive rebounds	31
38	Total rebounds	44
13	Assists	12
9	Turnovers	12
3	Steals	2
2	Blocks	2
21	Fouls	22

2020–21 Basketball Champions League champions

San Pablo Burgos
2nd title

Starters:			Pts	Reb	Ast
C	1	(Serbia) Dejan Kravić	8	8	0
SG	8	(Brazil) Vítor Benite	15	2	2
C	14	(Cuba) Jasiel Rivero	9	5	1
SF	22	(Spain) Xavier Rabaseda	0	5	1
PG	32	(Bosnia and Herzegovina) Alex Renfroe	14	6	4
Reserves:					
PF	7	(Belarus) Maksim Salash	0	0	0
F	9	(Spain) Álex Barrera	0	1	0
SF	11	(Spain) Miquel Salvó	5	3	0
PG	12	(Georgia (country)) Thaddus McFadden	5	0	1
C	18	(Democratic Republic of the Congo) Jordan Sakho	0	2	0
PG	20	(Montenegro) Omar Cook	3	1	2
PF	30	(United States) Ken Horton	5	2	1
Head coach:
(Spanish Basketball Federation) Joan Peñarroya

- Team captains (C): (United States) D. J. Kennedy (Karsiyaka) (Brazil) and Vítor Benite (Burgos)
