= List of Basketball Champions League finals =

- Founded: 2017; 8 years ago
- Region: Europe (FIBA Europe)
- Number of teams: 2
- Current champions: (Spain) Unicaja (2nd title)
- Most successful club(s): (Spain) San Pablo Burgos, (Spain) Canarias (Spain) Unicaja (2 titles each)
- 2024–25 Basketball Champions League

The Basketball Champions League is a seasonal basketball competition established in 2016. It is open to all member nations of FIBA Europe. After a regular season and playoffs, two teams face off in the final.

== List of finals ==
Key
†	Match was won after overtime

- The "Season" column refers to the season the competition was held, and wikilinks to the article about that season.
- The wikilinks in the "Score" column point to the article about that season's final game.

List of Basketball Champions League finals
Season	Winners		Score	Runners-up		Venue	Att.	Champions coach	Final Four MVP	Ref.
Season	Nation	Team	Score	Nation	Team	Venue	Att.	Champions coach	Final Four MVP	Ref.
2016–17	(Spain)	Canarias	63–59	(Turkey)	Banvit	Pabellón Insular Santiago Martín, La Laguna, Spain	5,050	Txus Vidorreta	Marius Grigonis	
2017–18	(Greece)	AEK Athens	100–94	(France)	Monaco	O.A.C.A. Olympic Indoor Hall, Athens, Greece	17,984	Zvezdan Mitrović	Mike Green	
2018–19	(Italy)	Virtus Bologna	73–61	(Spain)	Canarias	Sportpaleis, Antwerp, Belgium	16,437	Aleksandar Đorđević	Kevin Punter	
2019–20	(Spain)	San Pablo Burgos	85–74	(Greece)	AEK Athens	O.A.C.A. Olympic Indoor Hall, Athens, Greece	0	Joan Peñarroya	Thad McFadden	
2020–21	(Spain)	San Pablo Burgos	64–59	(Turkey)	Karşıyaka	Trade Union Sport Palace, Nizhny Novgorod, Russia	1,265	Joan Peñarroya	Vítor Benite	
2021–22	(Spain)	Canarias	98–87	(Spain)	Manresa	Bilbao Arena, Bilbao, Spain	8,157	Txus Vidorreta	Marcelo Huertas	
2022–23	(Germany)	Baskets Bonn	77–70	(Israel)	Hapoel Jerusalem	Palacio de Deportes José María Martín Carpena, Málaga, Spain	10,437	Tuomas Iisalo	T. J. Shorts	
2023–24	(Spain)	Unicaja	80–75	(Spain)	Lenovo Tenerife	Belgrade Arena, Belgrade, Serbia	5,237	Ibon Navarro	Kendrick Perry	
2024–25	(Spain)	Unicaja	83–67	(Turkey)	Galatasaray	SUNEL Arena, Athens, Greece		Ibon Navarro	Tyson Carter	

== List of top scorers ==
A team with an * denotes that they lost in the finals. The current record for most points in a BCL final is hold by T. J. Shorts who scored 29 points in the 2023 final.

Year	Player	Club	Points	Reference
2017	(Lithuania) Marius Grigonis	(Spain) Canarias	18	
2018	(United States) Mike Green	(Greece) AEK Athens	19	
2019	(United States) Kevin Punter	(Italy) Virtus Bologna	26	
2020	(Georgia (country)) Thad McFadden	(Spain) San Pablo Burgos	18	
2021	(France) Amath M'Baye	(Turkey) Karşıyaka*	17	
2022	(Nigeria) Chima Moneke	(Spain) Manresa*	24	
2023	(North Macedonia) T. J. Shorts	(Germany) Baskets Bonn	29	
2024	(United States) Kyle Guy	(Spain) Lenovo Tenerife*	18	
2025	(United States) Tyson Carter	(Spain) Unicaja	14	
2025	(United States) Will Cummings	(Turkey) Galatasaray*	14	
2025	(United States) Tyrone Wallace	(Turkey) Galatasaray*	14	
