= 2020 Basketball Champions League Final Eight =

4th Basketball Champions League tournament

- Season: 2019–20 season

Tournament details
- Arena: O.A.C.A. Olympic Indoor Hall; Athens, Greece
- Dates: 30 September – 4 October 2020

Final positions
- Champions: (Spain) San Pablo Burgos (1st title)
- Runners-up: (Greece) AEK
- Third place: (France) JDA Dijon
- Fourth place: (Spain) Casademont Zaragoza

Awards and statistics
- MVP: (Georgia (country)) Thad McFadden

The 2020 Basketball Champions League (BCL) Final Eight was the 4th Basketball Champions League tournament. It was the concluding phase of the 2019–20 Basketball Champions League season. Due to the COVID-19 pandemic and the following suspension of the league, the usual format of Final Four was changed to Final Eight. The tournament was played behind closed doors.

== Venue ==
The O.A.C.A. Olympic Indoor Hall hosted the final tournament for the second time, having already hosted the 2018.

Athens	2020 Basketball Champions League Final Eight (Europe)
O.A.C.A. Olympic Indoor Hall	2020 Basketball Champions League Final Eight (Europe)
Capacity: 18,989	2020 Basketball Champions League Final Eight (Europe)

== Bracket ==
Quarterfinals
30 September
(Turkey) Türk Telekom	82
(France) JDA Dijon	83
30 September
(Israel) Hapoel Jerusalem	65
(Spain) San Pablo Burgos	92
1 October
(Spain) Casademont Zaragoza	87
(Spain) Iberostar Tenerife	81
1 October
(Czech Republic) ERA Nymburk	82
(Greece) AEK	94

Semifinals
2 October
(France) JDA Dijon	69
(Spain) San Pablo Burgos	81
2 October
(Spain) Casademont Zaragoza	75
(Greece) AEK	99

Final
4 October
(Spain) San Pablo Burgos	85
(Greece) AEK	74
Third place game
4 October
(France) JDA Dijon	70
(Spain) Casademont Zaragoza	65

== Quarterfinals ==
30 September 2020	Hapoel Jerusalem (Israel)	65–92	(Spain) Hereda San Pablo Burgos	Athens
18:30	Scoring by quarter: 15–23, 17–26, 16–28, 17–15
	Pts: Mitrović, Pappas 13; Rebs: Thomas 7 Asts: Blatt 5 Eff: Thomas 15	Boxscore	Pts: Kravić, McFadden 18; Rebs: Kravić 10; Asts: Cook 7 Eff: Kravić 28	Arena: O.A.C.A. Olympic Indoor Hall; Attendance: 0 Referees: Aleksandar Glišić (SRB), Ademir Zurapović (BIH), Mārtiņš Kozlovskis (LAT)

30 September 2020	Türk Telekom (Turkey)	82–83	(France) JDA Dijon	Athens
21:30	Scoring by quarter: 24–18, 25–28, 13–19, 20–18
	Pts: Wiltjer 19; Rebs: Dekker 9 Asts: Enins 11; Eff: Ennis 21	Boxscore	Pts: Julien 19; Rebs: Alingue, Chassang 7 Asts: Holston 6 Eff: Julien 20	Arena: O.A.C.A. Olympic Indoor Hall; Attendance: 0 Referees: Manuel Mazzoni (ITA), Saverio Lanzarini (ITA), Tomas Jasevičius (LTU)

1 October 2020	ERA Nymburk (Czech Republic)	82–94	(Greece) AEK	Athens
18:30	Scoring by quarter: 23–21, 16–23, 19–25, 24–25
	Pts: Harding, Hruban 16; Rebs: Dalton 9 Asts: Rupnik 5 Eff: Hruban 17	Boxscore	Pts: Langford 18; Rebs: Moreira 8 Asts: Rice 5 Eff: Gkikas 16	Arena: O.A.C.A. Olympic Indoor Hall; Attendance: 0 Referees: Eddie Viator (FRA), Yohan Rosso (FRA), Mārtiņš Kozlovskis (LAT)

1 October 2020	Casademont Zaragoza (Spain)	87–81	(Spain) Iberostar Tenerife	Athens
21:30	Scoring by quarter: 20–17, 19–23, 24–16, 24–25
	Pts: Benzing 17; Rebs: Hlinason, Thompson 7 Asts: Enins 6 Eff: Brussino 17	Boxscore	Pts: Shermadini 22; Rebs: Shermadini, Doornekamp 8 Asts: Huertas 8 Eff: Shermadini 24	Arena: O.A.C.A. Olympic Indoor Hall; Attendance: 0 Referees: Manuel Mazzoni (ITA), Aleksandar Glišić (SRB), Saverio Lanzarini (ITA)

== Semifinals ==
2 October 2020	Hereda San Pablo Burgos (Spain)	81–67	(France) JDA Dijon	Athens
18:30	Scoring by quarter: 23–13, 20–17, 16–20, 22–17
	Pts: Benite 25; Rebs: Horton 10; Asts: Kravić, Renfroe 6 Eff: Horton 24	Boxscore	Pts: Julien 17; Rebs: Chassang 11; Asts: Holston, Julien 5 Eff: Julien 18	Arena: O.A.C.A. Olympic Indoor Hall; Attendance: 0 Referees: Manuel Mazzoni (ITA), Ademir Zurapović (BIH), Tomas Jasevičius (LTU)

2 October 2020	AEK (Greece)	99–75	(Spain) Casademont Zaragoza	Athens
21:30	Scoring by quarter: 26–15, 27–17, 30–25, 16–18
	Pts: Rice, Langford 18; Rebs: Mačiulis 9 Asts: Gkikas 8 Eff: Rice 22	Boxscore	Pts: Seeley 18; Rebs: Brussino 9 Asts: San Miguel 6 Eff: Brussino 21	Arena: O.A.C.A. Olympic Indoor Hall; Attendance: 0 Referees: Aleksandar Glišić (SRB), Saverio Lanzarini (ITA), Mārtiņš Kozlovskis (LAT)

== Third place game ==
4 October 2020	JDA Dijon (France)	70–65	(Spain) Casademont Zaragoza	Athens
17:00	Scoring by quarter: 21–19, 14–11, 22–14, 13–21
	Pts: Holston 20; Rebs: Vanwijn 9 Asts: Holston 6 Eff: Holston 21	Boxscore	Pts: Thompson 16; Rebs: Thompson 8 Asts: San Miguel 5 Eff: Thompson 21	Arena: O.A.C.A. Olympic Indoor Hall; Attendance: 0 Referees: Aleksandar Glišić (SRB), Saverio Lanzarini (ITA), Mārtiņš Kozlovskis (LAT)

== Final ==
4 October 2020	Hereda San Pablo Burgos (Spain)	85–74	(Greece) AEK	Athens
20:00	Scoring by quarter: 14–24, 35–12, 19–13, 17–25
	Pts: McFadden 18; Rebs: Kravić 11; Asts: McFadden 5 Eff.: McFadden 22	Boxscore	Pts: Rice 17; Rebs: Moreira 7 Asts: Gkikas 5 Eff.: Rice 17	Arena: O.A.C.A. Olympic Indoor Hall; Attendance: 0 Referees: Manuel Mazzoni (ITA), Yohan Rosso (FRA), Eddie Viator (FRA)
