= Basketball Champions League Final Four =

- Organising body: Basketball Champions League
- Founded: 2017; 9 years ago
- First season: 2017
- Number of teams: 4
- Current champions: (Spain) Unicaja (2nd title) (2025)
- Most championships: CB Miraflores, CB 1939 Canarias, Unicaja (2 titles)
- Website: championsleague.basketball
- 2025 Basketball Champions League Final Four

The Basketball Champions League Final Four (BCL Final Four) is the concluding final four tournament of each season's Basketball Champions League. The tournament's full official name is FIBA Basketball Champions League Europe Final Four. The BCL is an international professional basketball competition, that is contested by European clubs, and which is organized by the Basketball Champions League S.A., in conjunction with FIBA.

The final fours can either be hosted by one of the final four teams, or held at a neutral location.

== History ==
The very first BCL Final Four, the 2017 Basketball Champions League Final Four, was held from 28 April to 30 April, 2017.

During the 2019–20 season, due to the COVID-19 pandemic and the following suspension of the league, the usual format of a Final Four was changed to a Final Eight.

In 2025, sportsbook and casino company Betsson and solar energy company SUNEL became key sponsors of the BCL Final Four which was held in Athens after AEK Betsson BC, which both companies sponsor, qualified for the tournament, eventually coming in third. Baloncesto Málaga won the championship.

== Results ==
Season	Host city	Final			Third and fourth place		
Season	Host city	Winners	Score	Second place	Third place	Score	Fourth place
2017	(Spain); La Laguna	(Spain); Iberostar Tenerife	63–59; Details	(Turkey); Banvit	(France); Monaco	91–77	(Italy); Umana Reyer Venezia
2018	(Greece); Athens	(Greece); AEK	100–94; Details	(France); Monaco	(Spain); UCAM Murcia	85–74	(Germany); MHP Riesen Ludwigsburg
2019	(Belgium); Antwerp	(Italy); Virtus Segafredo Bologna	73–61; Details	(Spain); Iberostar Tenerife	(Belgium); Telenet Antwerp Giants	72–58	(Germany); Brose Bamberg
2020	(Greece); Athens	(Spain); San Pablo Burgos	85–74; Details	(Greece); AEK	(France); JDA Dijon	70–65	(Spain); Casademont Zaragoza
2021	(Russia); Nizhny Novgorod	(Spain); San Pablo Burgos	64–59; Details	(Turkey); Pınar Karşıyaka	(Spain); Casademont Zaragoza	89–77	(France); SIG Strasbourg
2022	(Spain); Bilbao	(Spain); Lenovo Tenerife	98–87; Details	(Spain); Baxi Manresa	(Germany); MHP Riesen Ludwigsburg	88–68	(Israel); Hapoel Holon
2023	(Spain); Málaga	(Germany); Telekom Baskets Bonn	77–70; Details	(Israel); Hapoel Jerusalem	(Spain); Lenovo Tenerife	84–79	(Spain); Unicaja
2024	(Serbia); Belgrade	(Spain); Unicaja	80–75; Details	(Spain); Lenovo Tenerife	(Spain); UCAM Murcia	87–84	(Greece); Peristeri
2025	(Greece); Athens	(Spain); Unicaja	83–67; Details	(Turkey); Galatasaray	(Greece); AEK Betsson	77–73	(Spain); La Laguna Tenerife

== Performances ==
Canarias holds the record for most Final Four appearances with six, winning twice (most recently in 2025). Unicaja CB and AEK Betsson BC have both appeared three times with Unicaja winning twice and AEK Betsson once.

=== By club ===
Club	1st	2nd	3rd	4th	Total
(Spanish Basketball Federation) Canarias	2	2	1	1	6
(Spanish Basketball Federation) Unicaja	2	–	–	1	3
(Hellenic Basketball Federation) AEK	1	1	1	–	3
(Spanish Basketball Federation) San Pablo Burgos	2	–	–	–	2
(French Federation of Basketball) Monaco	–	1	1	–	2
(Spanish Basketball Federation) UCAM Murcia	–	–	2	–	2
(Spanish Basketball Federation) Zaragoza	–	–	1	1	2
(German Basketball Federation) Riesen Ludwigsburg	–	–	1	1	2
(German Basketball Federation) Baskets Bonn	1	–	–	–	1
(Italian Basketball Federation) Virtus Bologna	1	–	–	–	1
(Spanish Basketball Federation) Manresa	–	1	–	–	1
(Israeli Basketball Association) Hapoel Jerusalem	–	1	–	–	1
(Turkish Basketball Federation) Karşıyaka	–	1	–	–	1
(Turkish Basketball Federation) Banvit	–	1	–	–	1
(Turkish Basketball Federation) Galatasaray	–	1	–	–	1
(Basketball Belgium) Antwerp Giants	–	–	1	–	1
(French Federation of Basketball) JDA Dijon	–	–	1	–	1
(Israeli Basketball Association) Hapoel Holon	–	–	–	1	1
(German Basketball Federation) Bamberg	–	–	–	1	1
(French Federation of Basketball) SIG Strasbourg	–	–	–	1	1
(Italian Basketball Federation) Reyer Venezia	–	–	–	1	1
(Hellenic Basketball Federation) Peristeri	–	–	–	1	1
Total	9	9	9	9	36

=== By country ===
Club	1st	2nd	3rd	4th	Total
Spain (Liga ACB)	6	3	4	3	16
Greece (GBL)	1	1	1	1	4
Germany (Basketball Bundesliga)	1	–	1	2	4
France (LNB Élite)	–	1	2	1	4
Turkey (BSL)	–	3	–	–	3
Italy (LBA)	1	–	–	1	2
Israel (Premier League)	–	1	–	1	2
Belgium (PBL / BNXT League)	–	–	1	–	1

== Arenas ==
Between 2017 and 2021, the Final Four (or Final Eight) was hosted in the home arena of one of the participating teams. In 2022, the BCL hosted its first Final Four on a neutral venue when they selected Bilbao Arena as host.

Year	Arena	City	Country	Capacity
2017	Pabellón Insular Santiago Martín	San Cristóbal de La Laguna	Spain	5,100
2018	OAKA Basketball Arena	Athens	Greece	18,989
2019	Sportpaleis	Antwerp	Belgium	18,400
2020	OAKA Basketball Arena (2)	Athens	Greece	18,989
2021	Trade Union Sport Palace	Nizhny Novgorod	Russia	5,500
2022	Bilbao Arena	Bilbao	Spain	10,014
2023	Palacio de Deportes José María Martín Carpena	Málaga	Spain	11,300
2024	Belgrade Arena	Belgrade	Serbia	18,368
2025	SUNEL Arena	Athens	Greece	9,025
