= 2019 Basketball Champions League Final =

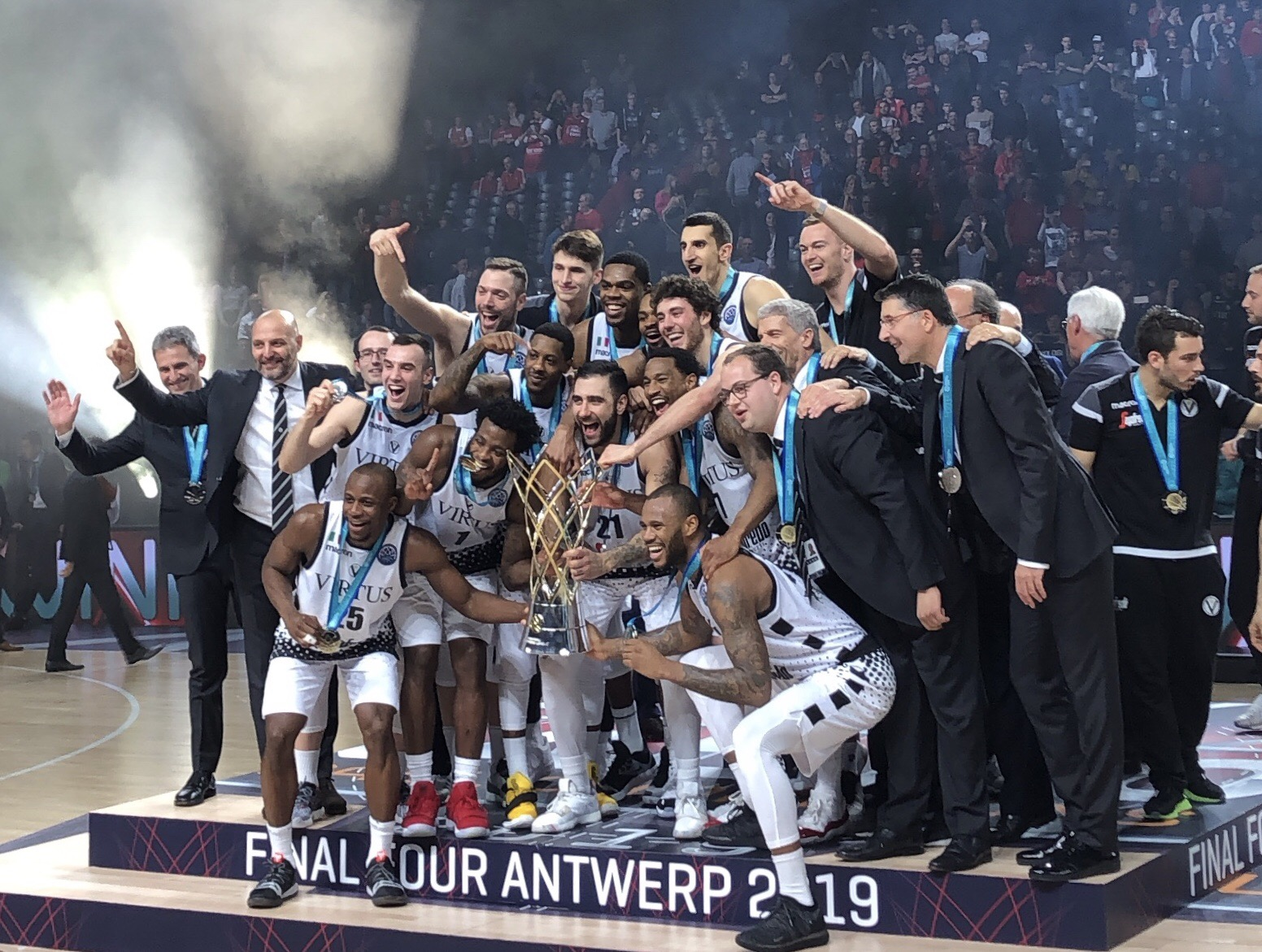
- Virtus Bologna celebrating after winning the final
- Event: 2018–19 Basketball Champions League
Virtus Bologna	Canarias
(Italy)	(Spain)
73	61
- Date: 5 May 2019
- Venue: Sportpaleis, Antwerp, Belgium
- Coaches: Aleksandar Đorđević; Txus Vidorreta
- MVP: Kevin Punter
- Referees: Yohan Rosso (France); Mārtiņš Kozlovskis (Latvia); Georgios Poursanidis (Greece)
- Attendance: 16,437

2019 Basketball Champions League Final was the concluding game of the 2018–19 Basketball Champions League season, the 3rd season of FIBA's premier basketball league in Europe. The final and the Final Four were played in the Sportpaleis in Antwerp, Belgium. The game was held 5 May 2019.

Virtus Bologna from Italy won its first BCL title and its first European title in ten years. Canarias played in its second final and finished second.

== Background ==
=== Virtus Bologna ===
Virtus' 2018–19 season began with the appointment of Alessandro Dalla Salda as new club's CEO and the hire of Stefano Sacripanti as new head coach. Aradori and Filippo Baldi Rossi were confirmed and the club signed, among others, Tony Taylor, Kevin Punter, Amath M'Baye and Brian Qvale, to participate in the Basketball Champions League, which was Virtus's first European competition after ten years. The team reached a record of seven wins in the first seven games of the continental competition, which had never been achieved before. In March 2019, the team signed Mario Chalmers, two-time NBA champion with the Miami Heat.

=== Canarias ===
Canarias, playing as Iberostar Tenerife for sponsorship reasons, had another successful BCL season.

== Venue ==
Antwerp	2019 Basketball Champions League Final (Europe)
Sportpaleis	2019 Basketball Champions League Final (Europe)
Capacity: 18,500	2019 Basketball Champions League Final (Europe)

== Road to the final ==
(Italy) Virtus Bologna				Round	(Spain) Canarias			
Opponent	Result				Opponent	Result		
Group D winners: Pos / Team / Pld / Pts; 1 / (Italy) Segafredo Virtus Bologna / 14 / 24; 2 / (Turkey) Beşiktaş Sompo Japan / 14 / 23; 3 / (Lithuania) Neptūnas / 14 / 22; 4 / (Greece) Promitheas / 14 / 22; 5 / (France) SIG Strasbourg / 14 / 22; 6 / (Belgium) Filou Oostende / 14 / 21; 7 / (Germany) Medi Bayreuth / 14 / 19; 8 / (Slovenia) Petrol Olimpija / 14 / 15; Source: Basketball Champions League				Regular season	Group B winners: Pos / Team / Pld / Pts; 1 / (Spain) Iberostar Tenerife / 14 / 26; 2 / (Italy) Umana Reyer Venezia / 14 / 24; 3 / (France) Nanterre 92 / 14 / 22; 4 / (Greece) PAOK / 14 / 22; 5 / (Israel) Hapoel Holon / 14 / 21; 6 / (Germany) Telekom Baskets Bonn / 14 / 20; 7 / (Switzerland) Fribourg Olympic / 14 / 17; 8 / (Czech Republic) Opava / 14 / 16; Source: Basketball Champions League			
Opponent	Agg.	1st leg	2nd leg	Playoffs	Opponent	Agg.	1st leg	2nd leg
(France) Le Mans	136–126	74–74 (A)	81–58 (H)	Round of 16	(Greece) Promitheas	136–126	57–69 (A)	79–57 (H)
(France) Nanterre	148–141	75–83 (A)	73–85 (H)	Quarter-finals	(Israel) Hapoel Jerusalem	154–139	73–75 (A)	81–64 (H)
(Germany) Bamberg	67–50			Semi-finals	(Belgium) Antwerp Giants	70–54		

== Game details ==
5 May 2019	Segafredo Virtus Bologna (Italy)	73–61	(Spain) Iberostar Tenerife	Antwerp, Belgium
18:00	Scoring by quarter: 20–8, 18–16, 20–20, 15–17
	Pts: Punter 26; Rebs: Punter 7 Asts: Taylor 5 PIR: Punter 29	Boxscore	Pts: Abromaitis 18; Rebs: Iverson 9 Asts: Beirán 3 PIR: Abromaitis 21	Arena: Sportpaleis; Attendance: 16,437; Referees: Yohan Rosso (FRA), Mārtiņš Kozlovskis (LAT), Georgios Poursanidis (GRE)

Starters:			Pts	Reb	Ast
PG	7	(United States) Tony Taylor	4	3	5
SG	0	(United States) Kevin Punter	26	7	1
SF	1	(United States) Kelvin Martin	2	2	1
PF	24	(France) Amath M'Baye	16	3	0
C	2	(Angola) Yanick Moreira	4	4	0
Reserves:					
PG	6	(Italy) Alessandro Pajola	DNP		
F/C	8	(Italy) Filippo Baldi Rossi	0	2	0
PG	9	(Italy) Alessandro Cappelletti	DNP		
C	11	(Serbia) Dejan Kravić	4	5	0
G	15	(United States) Mario Chalmers	8	2	2
G/F	21	(Italy) Pietro Aradori	9	1	1
G	25	(Italy) David Cournooh	0	1	0
Head coach:
(Basketball Federation of Serbia) Aleksandar Đorđević

Bologna	Tenerife

Bologna	Statistics	Tenerife
17/38 (44.7%)	2-pt field goals	13/28 (46.4%)
7/16 (43.8%)	3-pt field goals	5/37 (13.5%)
18/26 (69.2%)	Free throws	20/23 (87%)
11	Offensive rebounds	24
21	Defensive rebounds	20
32	Total rebounds	44
10	Assists	11
15	Turnovers	20
8	Steals	6
3	Blocks	1
26	Fouls	29

2018–19 Basketball Champions League champions

Segafredo Virtus Bologna
1st title

Starters:			Pts	Reb	Ast
PG	00	(Spain) Rodrigo San Miguel	3	2	1
SG	1	(Germany) Lucca Staiger	3	1	0
SF	9	(Argentina) Nicolás Brussino	2	1	0
PF	21	(United States) Tim Abromaitis	18	8	2
C	4	(United States) Colton Iverson	11	9	0
Reserves:					
SG	5	(Argentina) Nicolás Richotti	DNP		
C	7	(Senegal) Mamadou Niang	2	4	1
PG	10	(Spain) Ferrán Bassas	5	2	2
C	11	(Spain) Sebastian Saiz	1	2	0
PF	31	(Belgium) Pierre-Antoine Gillet	3	2	2
SF	33	(Spain) Javier Beirán	9	7	3
PG	34	(United States) Davin White	4	0	0
Head coach:
(Spanish Basketball Federation) Txus Vidorreta

- Team captains (C): (Italy) Pietro Aradori (Virtus Bologna) and (Italy) Nicolás Richotti (Iberostar Tenerife)
