= Jasiel Rivero =

Cuban basketball player

No. 41 – Valencia Basket
- Position: Center / power forward
- League: Liga ACB; EuroLeague

Personal information
- Born: October 31, 1993 (age 33) Havana, Cuba
- Listed height: 6 ft 9 in (2.06 m)
- Listed weight: 242 lb (110 kg)

Career information
- NBA draft: 2015: undrafted
- Playing career: 2015–present

Career history
- 2014–2015: Capitalinos
- 2015–2018: Estudiantes Concordia
- 2018–2019: Boca Juniors
- 2019–2021: San Pablo Burgos
- 2021–2023: Valencia
- 2023–2025: Maccabi Tel Aviv
- 2025–2026: Crvena zvezda
- 2026–present: Valencia

Career highlights
- 2× FIBA Champions League champion (2020, 2021); All-FIBA Champions League Second Team (2021); FIBA Intercontinental Cup champion (2021); All-Spanish League Second Team (2021); All-Argentine League Team (2019); Argentine League Top Scorer (2019); Cuban League champion (2015); All-Cuban League Team (2015); Cuban League MVP (2015); Cuban League Finals MVP (2015); Cuban League Top Scorer (2015)

Jasiel "Papi" Rivero Fernández (born October 31, 1993) is a Cuban professional basketball player for Valencia of the Liga ACB and the EuroLeague.

== Professional career ==
=== Argentina (2015–2019) ===
Rivero made his professional debut on January 1, 2016, for Estudiantes Concordia. Rivero played with Boca Juniors for the 2018–19 season, averaging 18.1 points per game (2nd in the league), while shooting 54% from the floor.

=== San Pablo Burgos (2019–2021) ===
On September 9, 2019, Rivero signed with San Pablo Burgos of the Liga ACB. Rivero would play a key part in San Pablo Burgos success in the Basketball Champions League as the club became champions both in the 2019-20 and 2020–21 campaigns.

In 2019-20, he scored 8.3 points and had 4.3 rebounds per game, while shooting 50% from the field. In 2020-21, he scored 12.3 points and had 6.0 rebounds per game, while shooting 57% from the field.

=== Valencia (2021–2023) ===
On July 15, 2021, despite interest from clubs such as Panathinaikos, Rivero decided to sign with Valencia Basket of the Liga ACB. He reunited himself with his former head coach Joan Peñarroya.

In 2021-22, he scored 11.1 points and had 4.2 rebounds per game, while shooting 59% from the field. In 2022-23, he scored 10.5 points and had 3.8 rebounds per game, while shooting 59% from the field.

=== Maccabi Tel Aviv (2023–2025) ===
On July 30, 2023, Rivero signed with Israel powerhouse Maccabi Tel Aviv.

=== Return to Valencia (2026–present) ===
On August 31, 2026, Rivero signed a one-month contract with Valencia of the Liga ACB and the EuroLeague. On September 30, 2026, he extended his contract with the club until the end of the season.

== National team career ==
Rivero represented Cuba during the 2015 FIBA Americas Championship. He averaged 18.8 points, 6.5 rebounds, and 0.5 assists.

== Career statistics ==
Legend
GP	Games played	GS	Games started	MPG	Minutes per game
FG%	Field-goal percentage	3P%	3-point field-goal percentage	FT%	Free-throw percentage
RPG	Rebounds per game	APG	Assists per game	SPG	Steals per game
BPG	Blocks per game	PPG	Points per game	PIR	Performance index rating
**Bold**	Career high

=== EuroLeague ===
Year	Team	GP	GS	MPG	FG%	3P%	FT%	RPG	APG	SPG	BPG	PPG	PIR
2022–23	Valencia	24	**3**	**18.8**	.547	.214	**.711**	**3.5**	.5	**.8**	**.3**	**9.4**	**9.2**
2023–24	Maccabi Tel Aviv	**40**	1	17.6	**.565**	**.571**	.646	3.1	**.9**	.6	**.3**	7.6	8.6
Career		64	4	18.8	.557	.333	.676	3.3	.8	.7	.3	8.3	8.8

=== EuroCup ===
Year	Team	GP	GS	MPG	FG%	3P%	FT%	RPG	APG	SPG	BPG	PPG	PIR
2021–22	Valencia	20	9	20.1	.657	.333	.600	4.4	.9	.6	.7	12.6	14.9
Career		20	9	20.1	.657	.333	.600	4.4	.9	.6	.7	12.6	14.9

=== Basketball Champions League ===
Year	Team	GP	GS	MPG	FG%	3P%	FT%	RPG	APG	SPG	BPG	PPG
2019–20	San Pablo Burgos	**17**	2	18.7	.520	**.346**	**.641**	5.0	.8	.5	**.6**	8.9
2020–21	San Pablo Burgos	13	**12**	**22.5**	**.624**	.308	.593	**6.8**	**1.5**	**1.1**	.5	**12.8**
Career		30	14	20.3	.573	.327	.619	5.8	1.1	.8	.6	10.6

=== FIBA Americas League ===
Year	Team	GP	GS	MPG	FG%	3P%	FT%	RPG	APG	SPG	BPG	PPG
2017–18	Est. Concordia	8	8	25.6	.507	.313	.571	4.5	1.0	1.0	.6	11.4
Career		8	8	25.6	.507	.313	.571	4.5	1.0	1.0	.6	11.4

=== Domestic leagues ===
Year	Team	League	GP	MPG	FG%	3P%	FT%	RPG	APG	SPG	BPG	PPG
2015–16	(Uruguay) Tabaré	LUB	5	34.0	.431	.188	.805	8.2	2.0	2.6	.4	19.6
2015–16	(Argentina) Est. Concordia	LNB	16	25.5	.458	.267	.605	4.1	.7	1.4	.4	8.9
2017–18	(Argentina) Est. Concordia	LNB	39	28.0	.557	.341	.717	5.2	1.2	.6	.7	18.0
2018–19	(Argentina) Boca Juniors	LNB	47	30.8	.542	.384	.681	5.2	1.4	1.2	.7	18.1
2019–20	(Spain) San Pablo Burgos	ACB	16	19.3	.460	.379	.564	3.8	.7	.2	.4	7.8
2020–21	(Spain) San Pablo Burgos	ACB	35	23.4	.559	.262	.655	5.5	1.1	.7	.4	12.2
2021–22	(Spain) Valencia	ACB	34	19.8	.548	.243	.557	4.1	.8	.9	.3	10.0
2022–23	(Spain) Valencia	ACB	25	19.6	.622	.440	.598	4.2	.7	.7	.6	11.7
2023–24	(Israel) Maccabi Tel Aviv	Ligat HaAl	26	19.3	.636	.250	.658	5.6	.9	.5	.4	11.3
