= Thad McFadden (basketball) =

American-Georgian basketball player

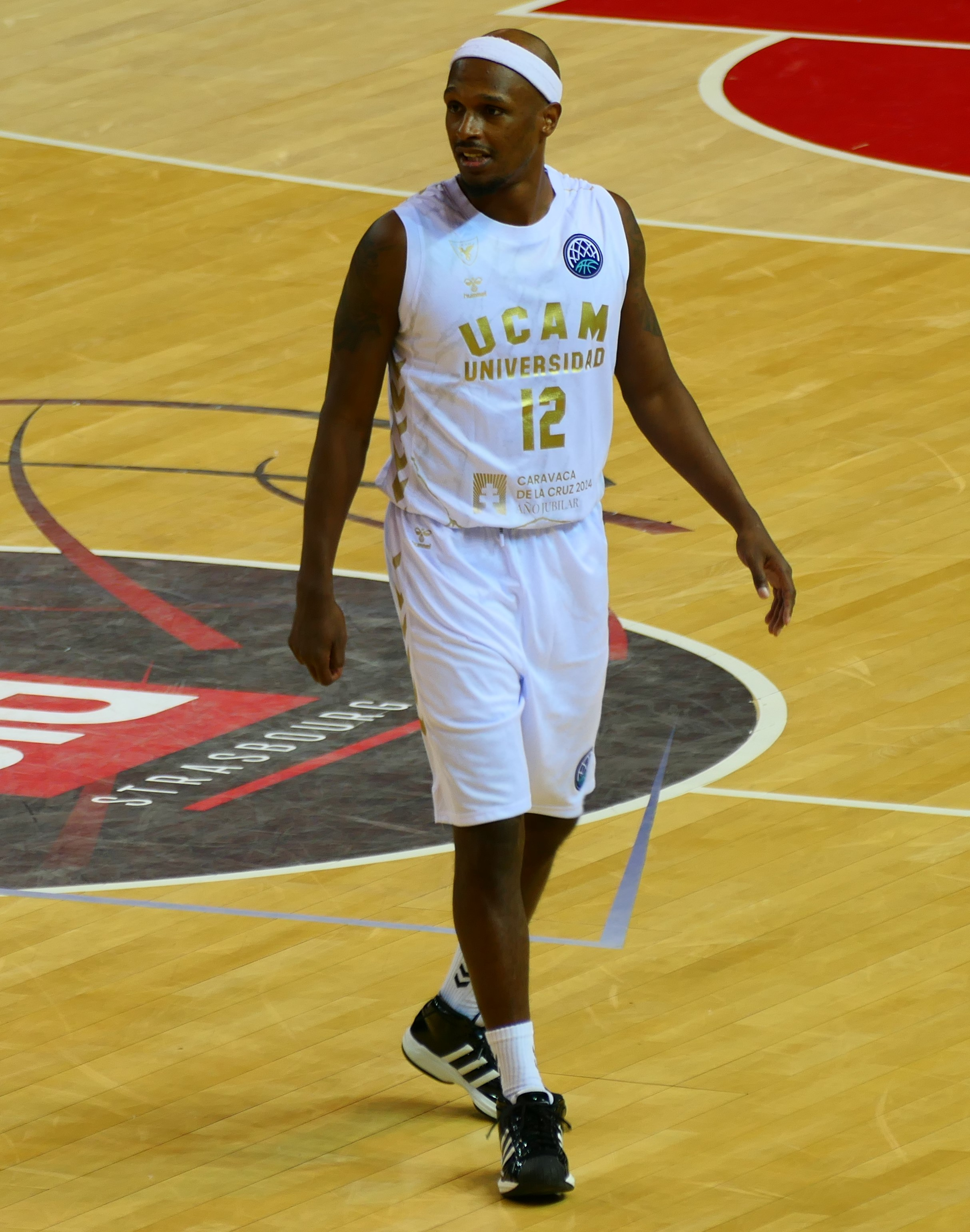
- McFadden with UCAM Murcia in 2022

No. 21 – CB Menorca
- Position: Point guard / shooting guard
- League: Primera FEB

Personal information
- Born: May 29, 1987 (age 39) Flint, Michigan, U.S.
- Listed height: 6 ft 2 in (1.88 m)
- Listed weight: 180 lb (82 kg)

Career information
- High school: Flint Southwestern (Flint, Michigan)
- College: St. Clair County CC (2005–2007); Fairmont State (2007–2009)
- NBA draft: 2009: undrafted
- Playing career: 2009–present

Career history
- 2009–2012: Ústí nad Labem
- 2012–2013: Phantoms Braunschweig
- 2013: →Ústí nad Labem
- 2013–2014: APOEL Nicosia
- 2014–2016: AEK Larnaca
- 2016: SLUC Nancy
- 2016–2017: PAOK Thessaloniki
- 2017: Karpoš Sokoli
- 2017–2018: Kymis
- 2018: Chongqing Sanhai Lanling
- 2018–2019: Laguna Tenerife
- 2019: Joventut Badalona
- 2019: Wuhan Dangdai
- 2019–2021: San Pablo Burgos
- 2021–2023: UCAM Murcia
- 2023: Trotamundos de Carabobo
- 2023–2024: Casademont Zaragoza
- 2024–2025: Halcones de Xalapa
- 2025–present: Bàsquet Menorca

Career highlights
- 2× Champions League champion (2020, 2021); Champions League Final Eight MVP (2020); FIBA Intercontinental Cup champion (2021); All-Greek League Team (2018); Greek All Star (2018); 3× Cypriot League champion (2014–2016); Cypriot Super Cup winner (2015); Cypriot League steals leader (2014); 2× First-team All-WVIAC (2008, 2009)

Thaddus Dewayn McFadden Jr. (born May 29, 1987) is an American-Georgian professional basketball player for Bàsquet Menorca of the Spanish Primera FEB. Standing at 1.88 m (6 ft 2 in), he plays at both guard positions. He played two years of JUCO college basketball at St. Clair County CC, and two years of Division II college basketball at Fairmont State, where he later went into the Fairmont State Hall of Fame. McFadden then entered the 2009 NBA draft, but he was not selected in the draft's two rounds. McFadden has won three Cypriot League championships.

== High school career ==
McFadden played high school basketball at Flint Southwestern Academy, leading the Knights to an 18–3 record as a senior. During his high school tenure, he led the city in three-pointers, and set a school record for the most three-pointers in a game (eight). He also earned First Team All-Saginaw Valley and All-State Honorable Mention honors, during the Flint Southwestern Academy national title run.

== College career ==
McFadden began his college basketball career at St. Clair County Community College (JUCO), where he led the Skippers in scoring each of his two seasons, averaging over 23 points and 4 assists per game, as a sophomore.

After two years at St. Clair County CC, McFadden transferred to Fairmont State (NCAA Division II), where he averaged 25.4 points as a senior, and was second in the country (Division II) in scoring.

== Professional career ==
After going undrafted in the 2009 NBA draft, McFadden joined Ústí nad Labem of the Czech Republic. He stayed at the club until 2012, being one of the top scorers of the team. During the 2011–12 season, McFadden was named the Player of the Year of the Czech League, by the website Eurobasket.com.

The following season, McFadden joined Phantoms Braunschweig of Germany's Bundesliga. Due to his poor performances, McFadden was loaned from the German team, to his previous club, Usti Nad Laben, until the end of the season.

On July 13, 2013, he joined APOEL of the Cypriot League. With APOEL, McFadden won the Cypriot League championship, and was the league leader in steals. On October 18, 2014, he signed with the Cypriot club AEK Larnaca. He stayed at AEK Larnaca until 2016, where he won two Cypriot League championships, the Cypriot Super Cup title, and was once again named the Cypriot League's Player of the Year, by the website Eurobasket.com, in 2016.

On June 30, 2016, McFadden signed with SLUC Nancy of France's LNB Pro A. On December 27, 2016, McFadden left Nancy, and signed with PAOK of the Greek Basket League, replacing Darryl Bryant on the team's squad.

On August 19, 2017, McFadden signed with Macedonian club Karpoš Sokoli. On November 20, 2017, he left Karpoš Sokoli due to financial problems and signed with Kymis. With Kymis, he had a terrific season, averaging 17.7 points, 4 assists and 2.9 rebounds per game. On July 3, 2018, he joined Chongqing Sanhai Lanling of the NBL for the rest of the season.

On July 17, 2018, McFadden signed a one-year deal with Iberostar Tenerife of the Liga ACB.

On August 3, 2018, McFadden scored a career-high 61 points to go along with a career-high 14 three-pointers made in a 149–121 blowout victory over the Beijing Bucks.

On March 8, 2019, McFadden signed with Club Joventut Badalona for the rest of the 2018–2019 season.

On August 1, 2019, McFadden signed a one-year deal with San Pablo Burgos. After averaging 12.3 points per game, he re-signed with the team on August 17, 2020.

With Burgos, McFadden won the 2019–20 Basketball Champions League after defeating AEK in the final. He led Burgos in both scoring and assists with 18 points and 5 assists in the championship game. As such, McFadden was named the Final Eight MVP award in the process.

On July 1, 2021, he has signed with UCAM Murcia of the Spanish Liga ACB.

On November 20, 2023, he agreed with UCAM Murcia his contract be terminated and shortly after, on November 22, he was announced by another Liga ACB participant, Basket Zaragoza.

On November 4, 2025, McFadden signed for Bàsquet Menorca of the Spanish Primera FEB.

== National team career ==
McFadden is a member of the senior Georgian national basketball team. He made his debut at a major tournament at EuroBasket 2022 which was co-hosted by Georgia, averaging 15 points per game.

He also helped Georgia qualify for its first-ever World Cup in 2023.

== The Basketball Tournament (TBT) (2017–present) ==
In the summer of 2017, McFadden played in The Basketball Tournament, aired on ESPN, for The Pearl 31's. He competed for the $2 million prize, and for The Pearl 31's, he scored 22 points and grabbed 5 rebounds, in their first round loss to Armored Athlete, by a score of 119–74.

== Personal life ==
McFadden is the son of former NFL professional American football player Thad McFadden Sr. and Flint business owner Lisa McFadden.
