= Basketball Champions League Final Four MVP =

Award of the Basketball Champions League

The Basketball Champions League Final Four MVP, or FIBA Champions League Final Four MVP, is an individual award of the Basketball Champions League, which is, along with the EuroCup, one of the two secondary level European-wide professional club basketball leagues

The award is given to the basketball player who exhibited the most exceptional play during the Basketball Champions League Final Four. The award is given out by FIBA, and it began with the Basketball Champions League's inaugural 2016–17 season.

== Winners ==
^	Denotes player who is still active in the BCL
*	Inducted into the FIBA Hall of Fame
Player (X)	Denotes the number of times the player has received the award

- Nationality as registered by FIBA. Player may hold more nationalities.

Year	Player	Position	Nationality	Club	Ref.
2017	Marius Grigonis	Small forward	Lithuania	(Spain) Iberostar Tenerife	
2018	Mike Green	Point guard	United States	(Greece) AEK	
2019	Kevin Punter	Shooting guard	United States	(Italy) Segafredo Virtus Bologna	
2020	Thad McFadden	Shooting guard	Georgia	(Spain) San Pablo Burgos	
2021	Vítor Benite	Shooting guard	Brazil	(Spain) San Pablo Burgos	
2022	Marcelo Huertas^	Point guard	Brazil	(Spain) Lenovo Tenerife	
2023	T. J. Shorts	Point guard	North Macedonia	(Germany) Telekom Baskets Bonn	
2024	Kendrick Perry^	Point guard	Montenegro	(Spain) Unicaja Malaga	
2025	Tyson Carter^	Shooting guard	United States	(Spain) Unicaja Malaga	
2026	Simonas Lukošius	Small forward	Germany	(Lithuania) Rytas Vilnius	
