= Axel Julien =

French basketball player

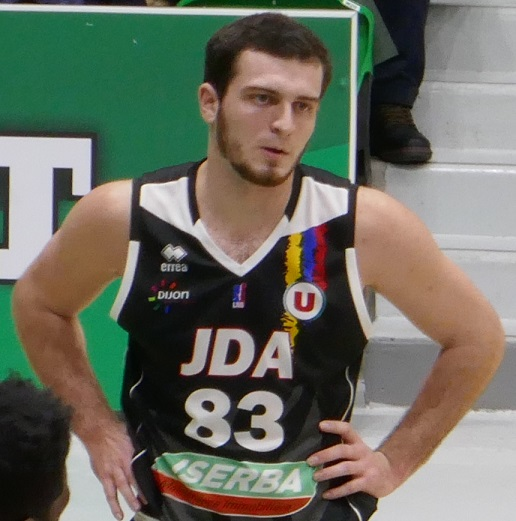
- Julien with JDA Dijon in 2017

Free Agent
- Position: Point guard

Personal information
- Born: 27 July 1992 (age 34) Saint-Tropez, France
- Listed height: 185 cm (6 ft 1 in)

Career information
- NBA draft: 2014: undrafted
- Playing career: 2009–present

Career history
- 2009–2015: Hyères-Toulon
- 2015–2021: JDA Dijon
- 2021–2024: JL Bourg
- 2024–2026: JDA Dijon

Career highlights
- LNB Leaders Cup winner (2020); 2× Pro A All-Star (2017, 2020)

Axel Julien (born 27 July 1992) is a French professional basketball player who last played for JDA Dijon of the LNB Pro A. He is a two-time LNB All-Star selection and has been a core member of Bourg since he joined the team in 2021.

== Professional career ==
Julien grew up with the juniors of HTV Basket and made his debut with their junior team ("Espoirs") in 2008. He won the LNB Pro A Leaders Cup in 2020 with JDA Dijon, his first major trophy.

On May 31, 2024, he signed with JDA Dijon of the LNB Pro A for a second stint.

== National team career ==
Julien has played for the France U20 and France university team. He played at the 2015 World University Games as well as at the 2012 FIBA U20 European Championship.
