= Hayden Dalton =

American basketball player (born 1996)

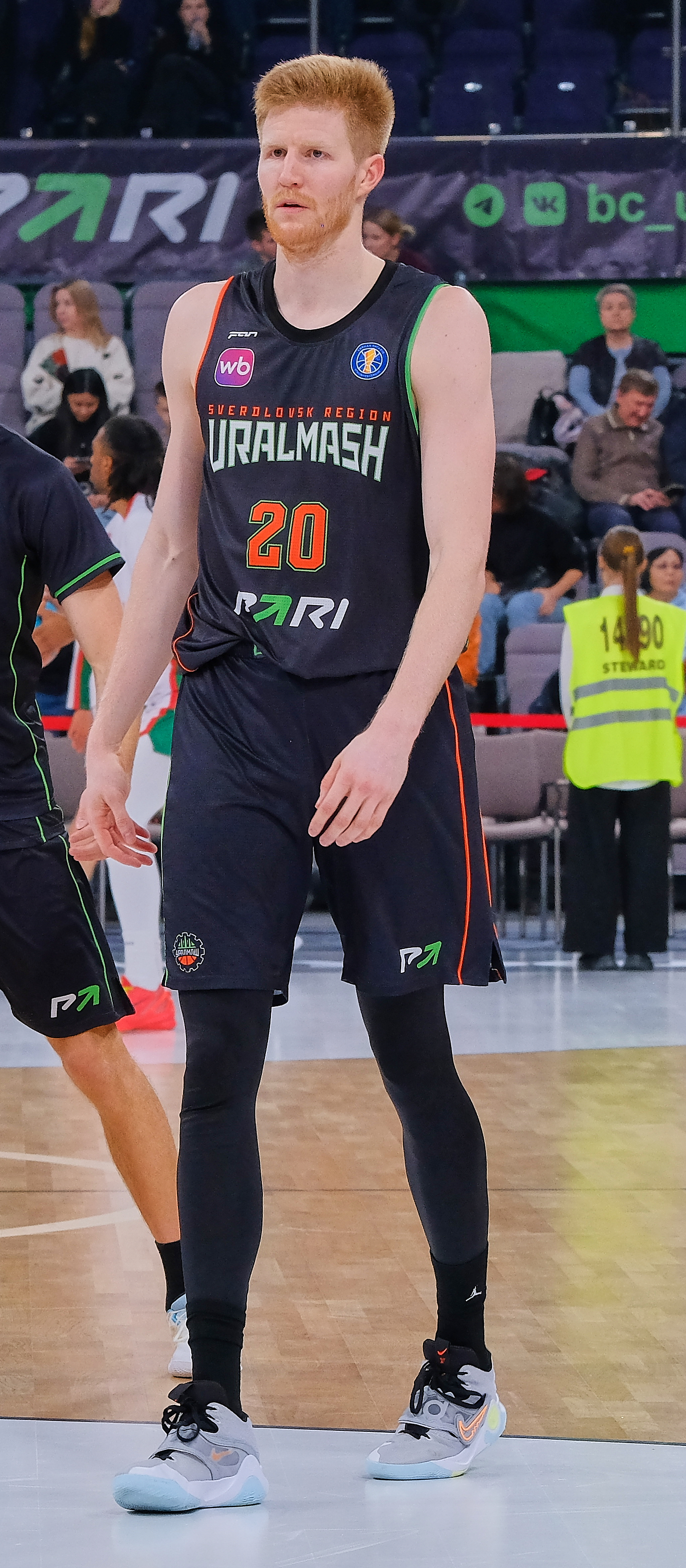
- Dalton in 2024

No. 20 – Uralmash Yekaterinburg
- Position: Power forward
- League: VTB United League

Personal information
- Born: June 20, 1996 (age 30) Parker, Colorado, U.S.
- Listed height: 6 ft 10 in (2.08 m)
- Listed weight: 228 lb (103 kg)

Career information
- High school: Chaparral (Parker, Colorado)
- College: Central Wyoming (2014–2015); Wyoming (2015–2018)
- NBA draft: 2018: undrafted
- Playing career: 2018–present

Career history
- 2018–2019: Bakken Bears
- 2019–2021: CEZ Nymburk
- 2021: JL Bourg-en-Bresse
- 2021–2022: CB San Pablo Burgos
- 2022–2023: Hapoel Holon
- 2023–2024: Samara
- 2024–present: Uralmash Yekaterinburg

Career highlights
- Israeli League champion (2022); CBI champion (2017); First-team All-Mountain West (2018)

Hayden Matthew Dalton (born June 20, 1996) is an American professional basketball player for Uralmash Yekaterinburg of the VTB United League. He plays the power forward position. He played college basketball for Central Wyoming College and the Wyoming Cowboys.

== Early life ==
He is the son of marriage counselors Mindy and Matt Dalton, and is originally from the small town of Parker, Colorado. Dalton's sister Nicole was on the University of Texas Longhorns volleyball team. He is the third of seven children. He is 6 ft 9 in (206 cm), and weighs 194 pounds (88 kg).

Dalton attended Chaparral High School. As a senior, he averaged 11.2 points, 10.2 rebounds, 1.5 assists, 2.0 blocks, and 1.2 steals per game. He was named First Team All-Continental League as a senior.

== College career ==
Dalton played the 2014–15 season at Central Wyoming College, which he attended on scholarship, for the Rustlers. He averaged 8.8 points, 6.2 rebounds, and 1.4 assists per game. He shot 48.6% from the field, 41.7% from three point range, and 80.4% from the foul line.

Dalton then transferred on scholarship and majored in business at the University of Wyoming. In 2015–16, playing for the Cowboys basketball team he averaged 3.8 points, 3.3 rebounds, and 1.0 assists per game, while shooting 44% from the field, 30% from three point range, and 79% at the free-throw line.

In 2016–17 for Wyoming he averaged 12.2 points, 8.3 rebounds (3rd in the Mountain West Conference), 0.9 blocks (8th), and 2.6 assists per game. Dalton shot 43% from the field, 35 percent from behind the three point line, and 83.4% from the free throw line (3rd). He was an Honorable Mention All-Mountain West selection.

On December 27, 2017, Dalton scored a career-high 36 points in an 82–69 win against San Diego State. In 2017–18, he averaged 17.7 points (7th in the conference) and 7.8 rebounds (5th) per game, with a .458 field goal percentage, a .403 3-point free throw percentage (6th), and an .838 free throw percentage (4th). He was named NABC All-District (17) Second Team, Mountain West All-Conference First Team (Media), and Mountain West All-Conference Second Team (Coaches).

== Professional career ==
In 2018–19, Dalton played for the Bakken Bears in Denmark. He averaged 10.7 points and 6.0 rebounds per game.

In 2019–20, he played for CEZ Nymburk in the Czech Republic. He averaged 9.6 points and 5.6 rebounds per game. In the 2020–21 season, he averaged 11.7 points, 7.2 rebounds, and 2.3 assists per game. Dalton signed with KK Cedevita Olimpija on June 13, 2021. However, he parted ways with the team on August 2, before appearing in a game.

Dalton began the 2021–22 season playing for JL Bourg-en-Bresse in France and averaged 3.7 points and 2.5 rebounds per game. On December 4, 2021, he signed with CB San Pablo Burgos in Spain.

Dalton signed with Hapoel Holon of the Israeli Basketball Premier League on January 29, 2022. He averaged 11 points and 5 rebounds per game. Dalton re-signed with the team on July 28.
