= Sergei Toropov =

Russian ethnographer (1928-1990)

Sergei Afanasyevich Toropov
- Born: 1928
- Died: 1990; Perm, Russia
- Occupation(s): regional ethnographer and historian

Sergei Afanasyevich Toropov (Russian: Серге́й Афанасьевич Торопов; 1928–1990) was a Russian historian and regional ethnographer, an author of a number of books on the history and geography of Perm Krai.

In 1978—1985 Toropov led Perm Regional Children's Center "Voskhozhdeniye" (Russian: Восхождение, ascension).

On 19 January 1982 a club "Permsky Krayeved" (Russian: Пермский краевед, Perm Regional Ethnographer) was created in Perm. Toropov became its first chairman. Club sessions at different years took place at Regional Station of Young Tourists, in House of Teachers, in Perm Region State Archive. Since 1991 club meetings was conducted monthly in Regional Library.

Toropov died in 1990 and was buried at Northern Cemetery in Perm.

== Published works ==
- (in Russian) С. А. Торопов. На трассе будущего (Вычегодско-Камский канал). // Широкие просторы. — М: Советская Россия, 1963.
- (in Russian) С. А. Торопов. По голубым дорогам Прикамья. Пермь, Кн. изд-во, 1976.
- (in Russian) С. А. Торопов. Дорогами народной славы: Путеводитель. — Пермь, 1984.
- (in Russian) С. А. Торопов. Пермь: Путеводитель. — Пермь: Кн. изд-во, 1986. — 160 с. Тираж 30 000 экз.
