= Jean-Baptiste Maille =

French basketball player

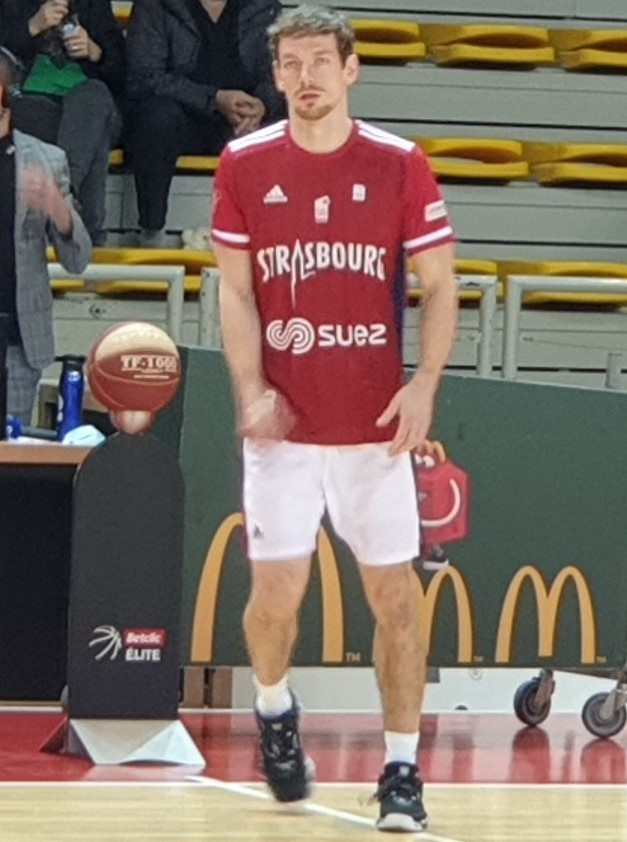
- Maille with Strasbourg in February 2022

Free Agent
- Position: Guard

Personal information
- Born: 23 November 1993 (age 32) Le Mans, France
- Listed height: 1.90 m (6 ft 3 in)

Career information
- Playing career: 2013–present

Career history
- 2017–2018: Limoges CSP
- 2020–2026: SIG Strasbourg

Jean-Baptiste Maille is a French professional basketball player who last played for SIG Strasbourg of the French LNB Pro A.

== Professional career ==
During the 2017–18 Pro A season, Jean-Baptiste Maille played for the league competitor Limoges CSP.

He was part of the SIG Strasbourg team that finished fourth at the 2020–21 Basketball Champions League.

== Personal ==
As a child, Maille admired Shawnta Rogers and Sandro Nicevic.
