= Joan Peñarroya =

Spanish basketball player and coach

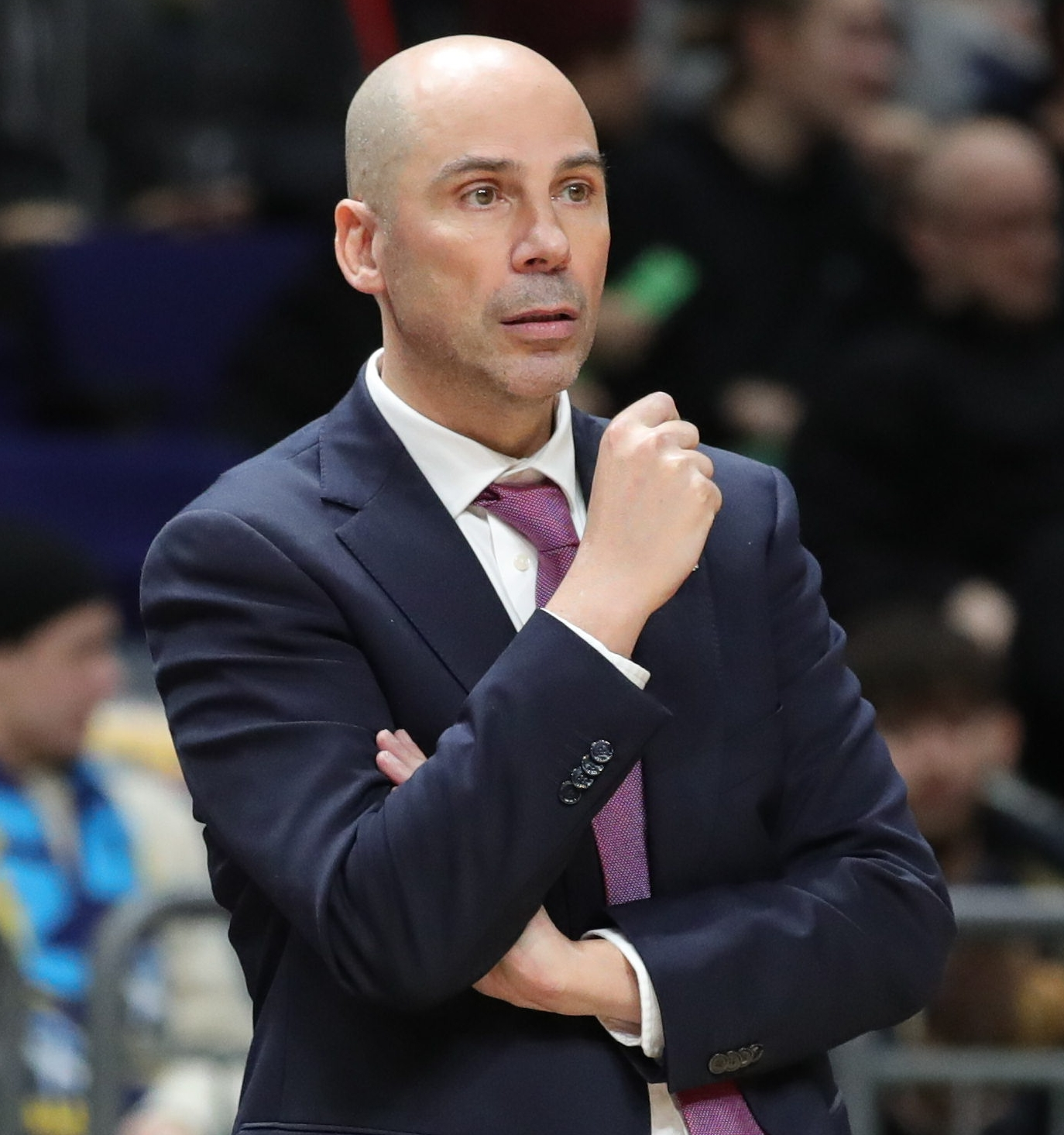
- Peñarroya in 2023

Partizan Belgrade
- Title: Head coach
- League: Serbian SuperLeague; ABA League; EuroLeague

Personal information
- Born: 20 April 1969 (age 57) Terrassa, Spain

Career information
- Playing career: 1987–2003
- Position: Guard
- Coaching career: 2006–present

Career history

Playing
- 1987–1990: Manresa
- 1990–1991: Canarias
- 1991–1997: Manresa
- 1997–1999: León
- 1999–2001: Ourense
- 2001–2003: Manresa

Coaching
- 2006–2010: CB Olesa i Navàs
- 2010–2018: Andorra
- 2018–2019: Manresa
- 2019–2021: Burgos
- 2021–2022: Valencia
- 2022–2023: Baskonia
- 2024–2025: FC Barcelona
- 2025–present: Partizan

Career highlights
- As player: Spanish Cup winner (1996); As coach: FIBA Intercontinental Cup champion (2021); 2× FIBA Champions League champion (2020, 2021)

Joan Peñarroya Rodríguez (born 20 April 1969) is a Spanish professional basketball coach and former player who is the current head coach for Partizan of the Serbian SuperLeague, the ABA League, and the EuroLeague.

== Playing career ==
A 1.91 m (6 ft 3 in) tall guard, Peñarroya started his playing career in 1987 with Manresa of the Liga ACB. He spent 11 seasons of his 16-year career with the club, winning the Spanish Cup in 1996. He also played for Canarias, León and Ourense.

== Coaching career ==
Peñarroya started his coaching career as assistant coach with CB Olesa of the Liga EBA. In 2010, he signed with BC Andorra of the LEB Plata. Peñarroya led the team to a promotion to the LEB Oro and later to the Liga ACB. He also coached in the EuroCup with Andorra.

In the 2018–19 season, Peñarroya coached Bàsquet Manresa, leading the team to the ACB playoffs for the first time since 1998.

In July 2019, Peñarroya signed as new head coach of San Pablo Burgos. In October 2020, he won the 2019–20 Basketball Champions League with Burgos, the club's first championship ever. The next season, he led his team to a repeat of the Champions League while also winning the 2021 FIBA Intercontinental Cup.

On June 21, 2021, he signed with Valencia Basket of the Liga ACB.

On June 13, 2022, Peñarroya signed with Baskonia of the Spanish Liga ACB. He was fired on October 30, 2023.

On June 14, 2024, Peñarroya signed a two-year contract with FC Barcelona of the Liga ACB and the EuroLeague. On November 9, 2025, the club announced they were parting ways with Peñarroya.

On December 23, 2025, he was announced as the new head coach of Partizan, taking over the Serbian team after the resignation of Željko Obradović. On November 21, 2026, he signed a contract extension to remain as Partizan's head coach until 2029.

== Coaching record ==
Legend
G	Games coached	W	Games won	L	Games lost	W–L %	Win-loss %

Note: The EuroLeague is not the only competition in which the team played during the season. He also coached in domestic competition, and regional competition if applicable.

=== EuroLeague ===
As of match played 23 October 2026

Team	Year	G	W	L	W–L%	Result
Baskonia	2022–23	34	18	16	.529	Eliminated in the regular season
Baskonia	2023–24	5	1	4	.200	Fired
FC Barcelona	2024–25	39	22	17	.564	Eliminated in Quarterfinal Playoffs
FC Barcelona	2025–26	9	5	4	.556	Fired
Partizan	2025–26	21	10	11	.476	Eliminated in the regular season
Partizan	2026–27	7	4	3	.571	
Career		115	60	55	.517	

== Personal life ==
Joan is the father of Marc Peñarroya, who is a professional basketball player as well.
