= Alex Renfroe =

American-Bosnian basketball player

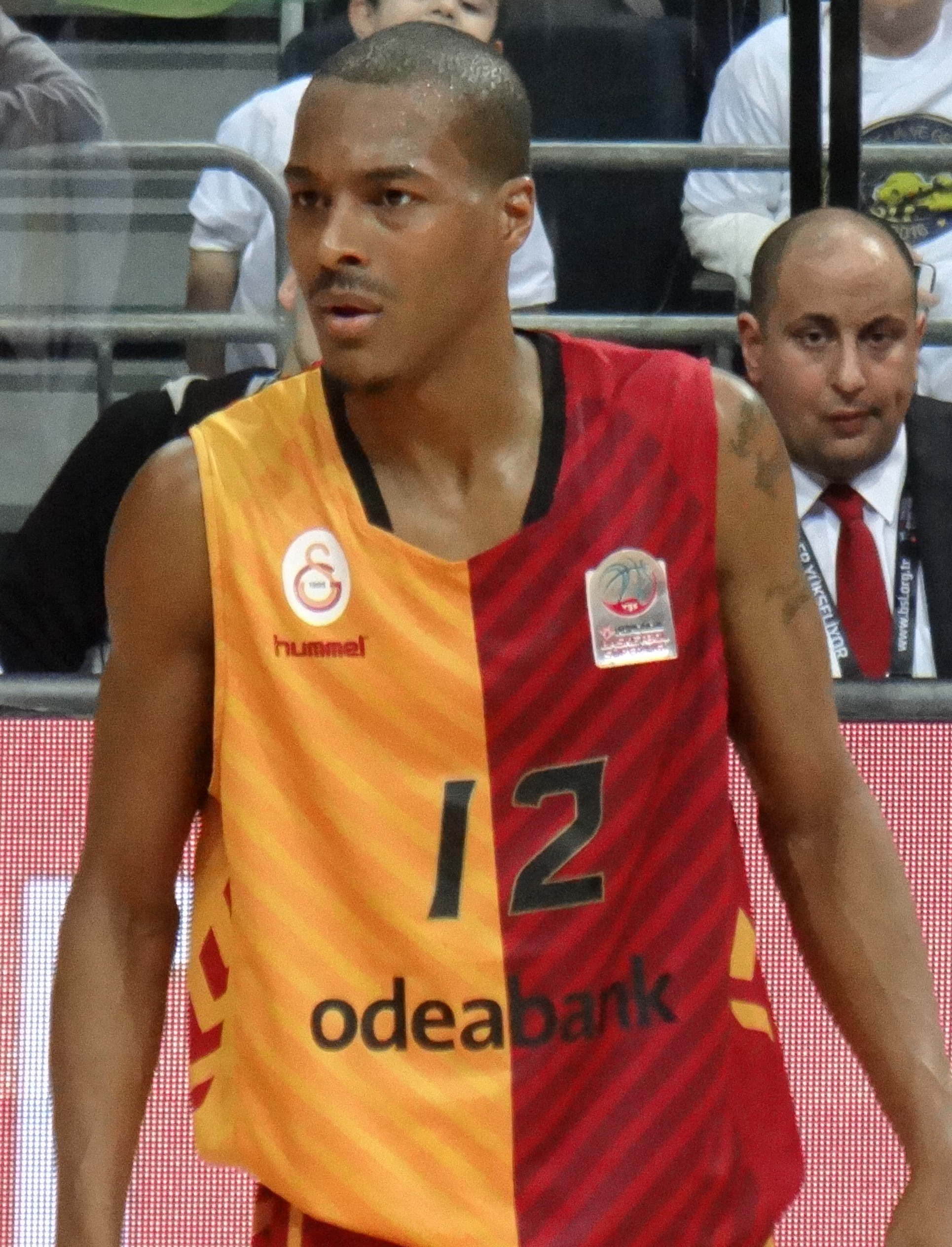
- Renfroe with Galatasaray in 2018

No. 32 – Baloncesto Fuenlabrada
- Position: Point guard / shooting guard
- League: Primera FEB

Personal information
- Born: May 23, 1986 (age 40) Hermitage, Tennessee, U.S.
- Listed height: 6 ft 3 in (1.91 m)
- Listed weight: 175 lb (79 kg)

Career information
- High school: Hume-Fogg (Nashville, Tennessee)
- College: Trevecca Nazarene (2004–2006); Belmont (2007–2009)
- NBA draft: 2009: undrafted
- Playing career: 2009–present

Career history
- 2009–2010: VEF Rīga
- 2010–2011: Zagreb
- 2011–2012: Brindisi
- 2012–2013: Valladolid
- 2013: Bamberg
- 2013–2014: Enisey
- 2014: Baskonia
- 2014–2015: Alba Berlin
- 2015–2016: Bayern Munich
- 2016–2017: Barcelona
- 2017–2018: Galatasaray
- 2018: Manresa
- 2018–2019: Partizan
- 2019–2020: Zenit Saint Petersburg
- 2020–2022: San Pablo Burgos
- 2022–2023: Covirán Granada
- 2023–2024: Bilbao Basket
- 2024–2025: Real Betis Baloncesto
- 2025–present: Fuenlabrada

Career highlights
- 2× Champions League champion (2020, 2021); All-VTB United League Second Team (2014); Croatian League champion (2011); German Bundesliga champion (2013); Croatian Cup winner (2011); Serbian Cup winner (2019); Baltic League MVP (2010); All-German Bundesliga First Team (2015); BBL All-Star (2016); Serbian Cup MVP (2019); Atlantic Sun Player of the Year (2009); First-team All-Atlantic Sun (2009); AP Honorable mention All-American (2009)

Gregory Alexander Renfroe (born May 23, 1986) is an American-born naturalized Bosnian professional basketball player for Fuenlabrada of the Primera FEB.

== College career ==
Renfroe played college basketball at Belmont University. He was named Atlantic Sun Conference Player of the Year in 2009.

== Professional career ==
After going undrafted in the 2009 NBA draft, Renfroe signed his first professional contract with BK VEF Rīga of Latvia for the 2009–10 season on July 11, 2009.

In August 2010, he signed with the Croatian club Zagreb for the 2010–11 season. On July 18, 2011, he signed with New Basket Brindisi of the Italian Legadue Basket for the 2011–12 season.

On September 24, 2012, he signed with CB Valladolid of Spain for the 2012–13 season. He left them in February 2013, and signed with Brose Baskets of Germany for the rest of the season.

On August 21, 2013, he signed with Yenisey Krasnoyarsk of Russia. On May 12, 2014, he signed with Laboral Kutxa Vitoria of Spain for the rest of the 2013–14 season.

On September 24, 2014, Renfroe signed a four-month contract with the German team Alba Berlin. On January 30, 2015, he signed a contract extension with Alba Berlin until June, 2015.

On June 28, 2015, Renfroe signed a two-year contract with the German club Bayern Munich.

On November 29, 2016, he parted ways with Bayern, and signed a contract with the Spanish club FC Barcelona for the rest of the season. On June 8, 2017, Barcelona announced the end of their contract with Renfroe.

On July 24, 2017, Renfroe signed with Turkish club Galatasaray for the 2017–18 season.

On July 18, 2018, Renfroe signed a one-year deal with Baxi Manresa of the Liga ACB.

On December 26, 2018, Renfroe signed with Serbian club Partizan for the rest of the 2018–19 season.

On June 19, 2019, Renfroe signed a one-year contract with the Russian club Zenit Saint Petersburg.

On July 3, 2020, Renfroe signed with San Pablo Burgos of the Liga ACB. With Burgos, he won the 2019–20 Basketball Champions League.

On August 24, 2022, he signed with Covirán Granada of the Spanish Liga ACB.

On August 19, 2024, he signed with Real Betis Baloncesto of the LEB Oro.

On December 9, 2025, he signed with Fuenlabrada of the Primera FEB.

== National team ==
In 2015, Renfroe received a Bosnian-Herzegovinian passport and represented the Bosnia and Herzegovina national basketball team at EuroBasket 2015.

== Career statistics ==
Legend
GP	Games played	GS	Games started	MPG	Minutes per game
FG%	Field-goal percentage	3P%	3-point field-goal percentage	FT%	Free-throw percentage
RPG	Rebounds per game	APG	Assists per game	SPG	Steals per game
BPG	Blocks per game	PPG	Points per game	PIR	Performance index rating
**Bold**	Career high

=== EuroLeague ===
Year	Team	GP	GS	MPG	FG%	3P%	FT%	RPG	APG	SPG	BPG	PPG	PIR
2014–15	Alba Berlin	**24**	8	26.5	.480	**.457**	.824	**4.5**	**5.3**	**1.4**	.1	9.8	**15.0**
2015–16	Bayern	10	**10**	**27.0**	**.531**	.440	.800	4.2	4.2	.6	**.2**	**10.1**	11.5
2016–17	Barcelona	17	2	17.4	.444	.387	**1.000**	2.1	1.6	1.0	.0	4.0	4.4
Career		51	20	21.5	.480	.417	.856	3.4	3.6	1.1	.1	8.0	10.1
