= Rodrigo San Miguel =

Spanish basketball player

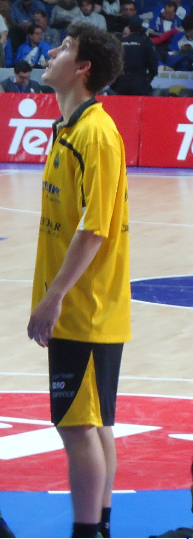

Casademont Zaragoza
- Title: Assistant coach
- League: Liga ACB

Personal information
- Born: January 21, 1985 (age 41) Zaragoza, Spain
- Listed height: 6 ft 1 in (1.85 m)
- Listed weight: 185 lb (84 kg)

Career information
- NBA draft: 2007: undrafted
- Playing career: 2004–2023
- Position: Point guard
- Number: 00, 21

Career history

Playing
- 2003–2004: Zaragoza
- 2005–2008: Valladolid
- 2005: →Pozuelo
- 2005–2006: →Plasencia
- 2008–2011: Manresa
- 2011–2013: Valencia
- 2013–2014: Murcia
- 2014–2019: Canarias
- 2019–2022: Zaragoza
- 2022–2023: San Pablo Burgos

Coaching
- 2023–2025: Zaragoza (assistant)
- 2025: Zaragoza
- 2025–present: Zaragoza (assistant)

Career highlights
- Champions League champion (2017); FIBA Intercontinental Cup champion (2017)

Rodrigo San Miguel (born 21 January 1985) is a Spanish professional basketball coach and former player who played at point guard position. He is currently the assistant coach for Casademont Zaragoza of the Liga ACB.

== Professional career ==
San Miguel was formed at Stadium Casablanca, team of Zaragoza. After playing one year with the top team of the city, CAI Zaragoza, he signs for CB Valladolid, where he rests four years, but the two first ones went on loan to LEBs teams.

After the relegation from Liga ACB of his team, in summer 2008 he signs for Bàsquet Manresa, where he plays during three seasons before being added by Valencia Basket for the two next seasons.

At the end of 2022–23 season, he announced his retirement from professional basketball.

== Coaching career ==
Before 2023–24 season, he started his coaching journey as an assistant coach at Casademont Zaragoza of the Liga ACB. On May 1, 2025, after the clob fired head coach Porfirio Fisac, he took over the head coach of the team until the end of the season.

== Spain national team ==
San Miguel played with all Spain national youth teams, achieving in 2001 the bronze medal at the European Championship hosted in Latvia.

== Awards and accomplishments ==
=== Pro career ===
- Copa Príncipe de Asturias: (1)
  - 2004

=== Spain national team ===
- European U16 Championship: Bronze
