= Dejan Kravić =

Serbian-Canadian basketball player

Coviran Granada
- Position: Center
- League: Primera FEB

Personal information
- Born: September 9, 1990 (age 36) Mostar, SR Bosnia and Herzegovina, SFR Yugoslavia
- Listed height: 2.12 m (6 ft 11 in)
- Listed weight: 112 kg (247 lb)

Career information
- College: York (2009–2011); Texas Tech (2012–2014)
- NBA draft: 2014: undrafted
- Playing career: 2014–present

Career history
- 2014–2015: Rethymno Cretan Kings
- 2015–2016: Den Bosch
- 2016–2017: Rethymno Cretan Kings
- 2017: Brussels
- 2017–2018: Panionios
- 2018–2019: Virtus Bologna
- 2019–2020: Obradoiro
- 2020–2022: San Pablo Burgos
- 2022: Unicaja
- 2022–2023: Victoria Libertas Pesaro
- 2023–2024: Casademont Zaragoza
- 2024–2025: Estudiantes
- 2025–2026: Obradoiro
- 2026–present: Granada

Career highlights
- 3× FIBA Champions League champion (2019–2021); FIBA Champions League All-Decade Second Team (2026); FIBA Intercontinental Cup champion (2021); Dutch League All-Star (2016); Dutch Cup winner (2016); Dutch Supercup winner (2015)

Dejan Kravić (Serbian Cyrillic: Дејан Кравић; born September 9, 1990) is a Serbian-Canadian professional basketball player for Granada of the Spanish Primera FEB. He played college basketball for the York Lions and Texas Tech Red Raiders. Kravić is a 3-time FIBA Champions League winner, winning it consecutively in 2019, 2020, and 2021.

== College career ==
Kravic started his college career with York University. In his sophomore season, Kravic averaged 15.6 points and 9.6 rebounds. In the 2011–12 season, he was redshirted. In the 2012–13 season, he played his first games for the Texas Tech Red Raiders. He was named to the First Team Academic All-Big 12.

== Professional career ==
=== 2014–15 season ===
On July 21, 2014, he signed his first professional contract with Rethymno Aegean in Greece.

=== 2015–16 season ===
On August 25, 2015, his arrival to SPM Shoeters Den Bosch of the Netherlands was announced. Kravić averaged 14.4 points and 9.4 rebounds per game in the DBL regular season. In the playoffs, he averaged 12.4 points and 6.5 rebounds in 8 games.

=== 2016–17 season ===
On July 25, 2016, Kravić returned to Rethymno, signing a two-year deal.

=== 2017–18 season ===
On July 14, 2017, Kravić signed with Excelsior Brussels. On October 20, 2017, he left Brussels. In November 2017, he signed with Panionios of the Greek League.

==== The Basketball Tournament (TBT) ====
In the summer of 2017, Kravić played in The Basketball Tournament on ESPN for Team Fredette. He competed for the $2 million prize, and for Team Fredette, he scored 12 points in their first round game, which they lost to Team Utah (Utah Alumni) 100-97.

=== 2018–19 season ===
On July 5, 2018, Kravić signed a deal with Virtus Bologna. With Virtus, he won the Basketball Champions League (BCL) trophy on May 5, 2019. The team beat Iberostar Tenerife in the final, Kravić had 4 points and 5 rebounds in the deciding game. Kravić joined Obradoiro in 2019 and averaged 13.2 points and 6.4 rebounds per game in ACB play.

=== 2019–20 season ===
On July 21, 2020, he has signed with San Pablo Burgos of the Liga ACB. He won the Basketball Champions League for a second year in a row with Burgos. He became the second player ever to have won two BCL titles, after Kevin Punter.

=== 2021–22 season ===
Kravić began the season with San Pablo Burgos and averaged 8.7 points, 5.9 rebounds, and 1.1 assists per game.

On January 28, 2022, he signed with Unicaja.

=== 2022–23 season ===
On August 16, 2022, he has signed with Victoria Libertas Pesaro of the Italian Lega Basket Serie A (LBA).

In October 2025, he returned to Obradoiro CAB of the Spanish Primera FEB to cover a vacant spot in the roster after the injury of fellow Serbian center Goran Huskić.

== International career ==
Kravic is eligible to play in the Serbian national basketball team.

In June 2014, national team head coach Saša Đorđević included him on the preliminary list of 29 players being considered for the twelve roster spots for the 2014 FIBA World Cup. Three weeks later, in early July 2014, Kravić further made Đorđević's shortened list of 20 players invited for the training camp. However, in early August, following the training camp, he got cut as the team began its pre-tournament friendlies.

== Career statistics ==
Legend
GP	Games played	GS	Games started	MPG	Minutes per game
FG%	Field goal percentage	3P%	3-point field goal percentage	FT%	Free throw percentage
RPG	Rebounds per game	APG	Assists per game	SPG	Steals per game
BPG	Blocks per game	PPG	Points per game	**Bold**	Career high

=== Europe ===
Year	Team	League	GP	MPG	FG%	3P%	FT%	RPG	APG	SPG	BPG	PPG
2014–15	Rethymno Aegean	GBL	26	16.6	.510	.000	.500	4.8	0.2	0.4	0.8	6.6
2016–17	Rethymno Aegean	GBL	13	22.2	**.638**	.000	.571	5.7	0.4	0.9	1.0	9.4
2017–18	Panionios	GBL	22	18.9	.614	.000	.620	4.9	0.5	0.9	1.1	11.8
2018–19	Virtus Bologna	LBA	28	21.6	.579	.000	**.675**	5.9	0.5	0.6	1.2	10.9
2019–20	Obradoiro	ACB	23	**27.7**	.602	.000	.632	**6.4**	**1.0**	**1.0**	**1.3**	**13.2**
2020–21	San Pablo Burgos	ACB	**33**	20.7	.598	.000	.530	4.7	0.7	**1.0**	0.7	10.8
Career			145	21.1	.588	.000	.599	5.3	0.6	0.8	1.0	10.5

=== College ===
Year	Team	GP	GS	MPG	FG%	3P%	FT%	RPG	APG	SPG	BPG	PPG
2012–13	Texas Tech	31	28	**21.5**	**.515**	.000	.611	**5.2**	**1.2**	**.7**	**1.3**	**9.0**
2013–14	Texas Tech	**32**	**29**	21.2	.505	.000	**.646**	4.6	.8	.4	**1.3**	7.3
Career		63	57	21.3	.511	.000	.628	4.9	1.0	.6	1.3	8.1

== Honours ==
=== Club ===
Den Bosch

- NBB Cup: 2015–16
- Dutch Supercup: 2015

Virtus Bologna

- Basketball Champions League: 2018–19

San Pablo Burgos

- Basketball Champions League: 2019–20, 2020–21
- FIBA Intercontinental Cup: 2021

=== Individual ===
- Dutch League All-Star: 2016
- York University male rookie of the year: 2010
