= 2021 FIBA Intercontinental Cup =

- Event: FIBA Intercontinental Cup
Quimsa	Hereda San Pablo Burgos
(Argentina)	(Spain)
73	82
- Date: 6 February 2021
- Venue: Estadio Obras Sanitarias, Buenos Aires, Argentina
- MVP: Vítor Benite (Hereda San Pablo Burgos)
- Attendance: 0 (behind closed doors)

The 2021 FIBA Intercontinental Cup was the 30th edition of the FIBA Intercontinental Cup. The tournament was played in one game to be held on 6 February 2021. The game was played in the Estadio Obras Sanitarias in Buenos Aires, Argentina. It was the fourth time the competition was hosted in this venue.

The game was played on by Spanish side Hereda San Pablo Burgos, winners of the 2020–21 Basketball Champions League, and Argentine side Quimsa, winners of the 2021 Basketball Champions League Americas. Both teams made their debut in the Intercontinental Cup.

The game was played behind closed doors due to the COVID-19 pandemic. San Pablo Burgos won the game 82–73 and won their first Intercontinental Cup title.

== Teams ==
Location of teams of the 2021 FIBA Intercontinental Cup

Team	Qualification	Qualified date	Participations (bold indicates winners)
(Spain) Hereda San Pablo Burgos	Winners of the 2019–20 Champions League season	4 October 2020	Debut
(Argentina) Quimsa	Winners of the 2019–20 Champions League Americas season	30 October 2020	Debut

== Venue ==
On 16 December 2020, FIBA announced that the Estadio Obras Sanitarias in Buenos Aires was selected as venue for the competition. The arena, located in the Núñez neighbourhood Argentinia's capital, has a capacity for 3,100 people. Opened in 1978, it serves as home arena of Obras Sanitarias. It was the fourth time the arena hosted the Intercontinental Cup. It hosted the FIBA Intercontinental Cup's 1978 edition, the 1983 edition, in which the local club Obras Sanitarias won the title, the 1986 edition, in which Žalgiris Kaunas won the title.

	2021 FIBA Intercontinental Cup (Argentina)
Buenos Aires	2021 FIBA Intercontinental Cup (Argentina)
Estadio Obras Sanitarias	2021 FIBA Intercontinental Cup (Argentina)
Capacity: 3,100	2021 FIBA Intercontinental Cup (Argentina)

== Match details ==
6 February 2021	Quimsa (Argentina)	73–**82**	(Spain) **Hereda San Pablo Burgos**	Buenos Aires, Argentina
18:00 (UTC-3)	Scoring by quarter: 20–**25**, 12–**31**, **23**–11, **18**–15
	Pts: Robinson 25; Rebs: Simpson 10; Asts: Cosolito, Robinson 3	Boxscore	Pts: Benite 19; Rebs: Rivero 10; Asts: Cook 9	Arena: Estadio Obras Sanitarias; Attendance: 0 Referees: Roberto Vázquez (PUR), Ademir Zurapović (BIH), Andrés Bartel (URU)
