= Vítor Benite =

Brazilian-Italian basketball player

No. 8 – Baloncesto Fuenlabrada
- Position: Shooting guard
- League: Primera FEB

Personal information
- Born: February 20, 1990 (age 36) Jundiaí, Brazil
- Listed height: 6 ft 4.5 in (1.94 m)
- Listed weight: 194 lb (88 kg)

Career information
- NBA draft: 2012: undrafted
- Playing career: 2008–present

Career history
- 2008–2009: Pinheiros
- 2009–2011: Franca
- 2011–2012: Limeira
- 2012–2015: Flamengo
- 2015–2018: UCAM Murcia
- 2018: Cedevita
- 2018–2022: San Pablo Burgos
- 2022–2023: Gran Canaria
- 2023–2024: CD Zunder Palencia
- 2024–2025: Real Betis Baloncesto
- 2025–present: Fuenlabrada

Career highlights
- EuroCup champion (2023); 2× Champions League champion (2020, 2021); 2× FIBA Intercontinental Cup champion (2014, 2021); All-Champions League Second Team (2020); Champions League Final Eight MVP (2021); Champions League All-Decade Second Team (2026); FIBA Intercontinental Cup MVP (2021); 3× Brazilian League champion (2013–2015); 2× Brazilian League Sixth Man of the Year (2011, 2015); Brazilian League Revelation Player (2011); Brazilian League Most Improved Player (2011); 3× Brazilian All-Star (2011–2013)
Medals
Men's basketball
Representing Brazil
FIBA AmeriCup
Gold medal – first place	2025 Managua
Silver medal – second place	2011 Mar del Plata
Silver medal – second place	2022 Brazil
FIBA South American Championship
Bronze medal – third place	2014 Venezuela
Pan American Games
Gold medal – first place	2015 Toronto

Vítor Alves Benite (born February 20, 1990), commonly known as Vítor Benite, or simply as Benite, is a Brazilian-Italian professional basketball player for Fuenlabrada of the Primera FEB. At a height of 1.94 m (6'4 1/2") tall, he plays at the shooting guard position. He also represents the senior Brazilian national basketball team.

== Early life ==
Benite was born in Jundiaí, in São Paulo state. His father, Francisco Carlos Benite, was an engineer, and he moved the family to Rio de Janeiro for a new job. There, the young Benite was spotted by Boleta, the coach of Flamengo, while Benite was playing with his brothers. Boleta brought the boys to the Flamengo athletic club, where Benite started his youth career in 1997. Benite would attend school in the morning and play basketball in the afternoon. When he was a few years older, Benite continued his youth career in Campinas, playing at Clube de Regatas Campinas. He finished his amateur youth career with Rio Claro Futebol Clube.

== Professional career ==
After the end of his youth career with Ulbra/Rio Claro, Benite was signed by Pinheiros, joining the team for the first season (2009) of competition for the newly created Novo Basquete Brasil (NBB), the top tier of Brazilian basketball. The following two years Benite played for Franca.

=== 2009–10 season ===
In his first season playing for Franca, Benite proved to be a great player. Because of his great matches, he was nominated for the NBB Revelation Player award, but Raulzinho won the award. This achievement helped Raulzinho to reach to Brazil national basketball team.

=== 2010–11 season: The new Brazilian jewel ===
In his second season in Franca, Benite made his best season, when he helped his team to reach to the final series of the championship. But Franca did not support the strength of the future champion Brasília and became runner-up. Despite the defeat, Benite was chosen the NBB Sixth Man of the Year, the NBB Most Improved Player and the NBB Revelation Player. After his great season, Benite was chosen by the Argentine coach Rubén Magnano to play the 2011 FIBA Americas Championship for Brazil national basketball team. After two seasons in Franca, Benite moved to Limeira.

=== 2011–12 season: Moving to Limeira ===
Arriving in Limeira, Benite adopted the speech he wanted to play as point guard. His beginning season was excellent. Benite led his team to a great position in championship. But it did not last until the end of the season and Limeira ranked ninth place. In the playoffs, Limeira was defeated by Joinville.

=== 2012–13 season: The arrival at Flamengo and the first championship ===
With the end of the season, Benite moved to Flamengo, where he started his career. The arrival of Benite and arrivals from other players like Marquinhos, Olivinha, Kojo Mensah and Shilton dos Santos the club from Gávea gave to the group the status of super-team, a team formed only by stars and became the main contender for the NBB. In the state championship, Flamengo didn't have to reach its eighth consecutive title, which was conquered unbeaten. In Liga Sudamericana, Benite and his teammates reached the Final Four, defeated Regatas Corrientes and Peñarol Mar del Plata, but lost to Brasília, which prevented the title that got the team from Corrientes.

In FIBA Americas League, Flamengo qualified for the semifinals, with great performances from Benite. But in the semifinals, the team went through its worst season and lost all three matches, finishing last in the group.

But the NBB, the story was totally different. The coach led by José Neto impose a sequence of 20 consecutive victories, only being defeated in the second round of the regular season. Benite was chosen to play the NBB All-Star Game for the third consecutive time, but due to an injury, he had little time in the court. Recovered from his injury, Benite returned to play great matches . Flamengo finished the first stage in the first place, and in the playoffs, eliminated Paulistano, São José to reach the final of the championship. But in the week of the Final, Benite he felt the same injury that had left out a few games in the first round. Benite not played the Final, but it was very important to give support to his teammates . Benite saw his team once again be national champion. A great season Benite earned him his return to Brazil national team, to play in the 2013 FIBA Americas Championship.

=== 2018–present ===
On July 23, 2018, he signed with Cedevita. Benite later signed with San Pablo Burgos. He averaged 13.5 points per game during the 2019–20 season, and re-signed with the team on July 16, 2020. In October 2020, he won the 2019–20 Basketball Champions League with Burgos.

On August 5, 2022, he has signed with Gran Canaria of the Spanish Liga ACB.

On August 27, 2024, he signed with Real Betis Baloncesto of the LEB Oro.

On September 11, 2025, he signed with Baloncesto Fuenlabrada of the Primera FEB.

== National team career ==
Benite has been a member of the senior Brazilian national basketball team. With Brazil, he has played at the following major tournaments: the 2011 FIBA AmeriCup, the 2012 FIBA South American Championship, the 2013 FIBA AmeriCup, the 2014 FIBA South American Championship, the 2015 Pan American Games, the 2015 FIBA AmeriCup, and the 2016 Summer Olympics. He won the silver medal at the 2011 FIBA AmeriCup, the bronze medal at the 2014 FIBA South American Championship, and the gold medal at the 2015 Pan American Games.

== NBB career statistics ==
=== NBB regular season ===
Season	Team	GP	MPG	2PT FG%	3PT FG%	FT%	RPG	APG	SPG	BPG	PPG
2009	Pinheiros	21	29.8	.477	.459	.660	2.1	2.4	1.1	.2	10.0
2009–10	Franca	26	26.6	.405	.316	.747	2.4	2.2	.7	.3	10.7
2010–11	Franca	24	28.5	.542	.398	.865	2.6	2.6	1.0	.1	15.3
2011–12	Limeira	28	32.4	.479	.366	.857	2.6	3.6	1.2	.1	14.6
2012–13	Flamengo	33	29.8	.486	.434	.757	2.8	2.0	1.5	.1	13.5
2013–14	Flamengo	3	34.3	.426	.294	1.000	1.7	.7	1.0	.0	15.3
2014–15	Flamengo	28	22.4	.521	.411	.840	2.1	1.4	.6	.0	11.7
Career		163	29.2	.483	.392	.802	2.3	2.1	1.0	.1	12.8
All-Star		3	-	-	-	-	-	-	-	-	5.6

=== NBB playoffs ===
Season	Team	GP	MPG	2PT FG%	3PT FG%	FT%	RPG	APG	SPG	BPG	PPG
2009	Pinheiros	3	16.5	.0	.143	.500	3.0	1.7	.3	.0	1.3
2010–11	Franca	10	27.3	.478	.423	.687	1.4	2.6	.8	.0	13.2
2011–12	Limeira	5	31.6	.528	.444	.897	2.4	2.0	2.2	.0	17.6
2012–13	Flamengo	8	23.7	.558	.647	.842	1.8	0.9	.5	.1	12.1
2013–14	Flamengo	1	10.5	.1.000	1.000	1.000	1.0	.0	.0	.0	8.0
2014–15	Flamengo	10	27.5	.502	.414	.818	3.3	1.8	1.2	.1	11.6
Career		37	22.9	.518	.444	.804	2.1	1.5	.8	.0	12.0

== Awards and accomplishments ==
- 3× NBB champion: (2013, 2014, 2015)
- NBB Sixth Man of the Year: (2011)
- NBB Most Improved Player: (2011)
- NBB Revelation Player: (2011)
- 3× NBB All-Star: (2011, 2012, 2013)
