= Nicolás Brussino =

Argentine basketball player (born 1993)

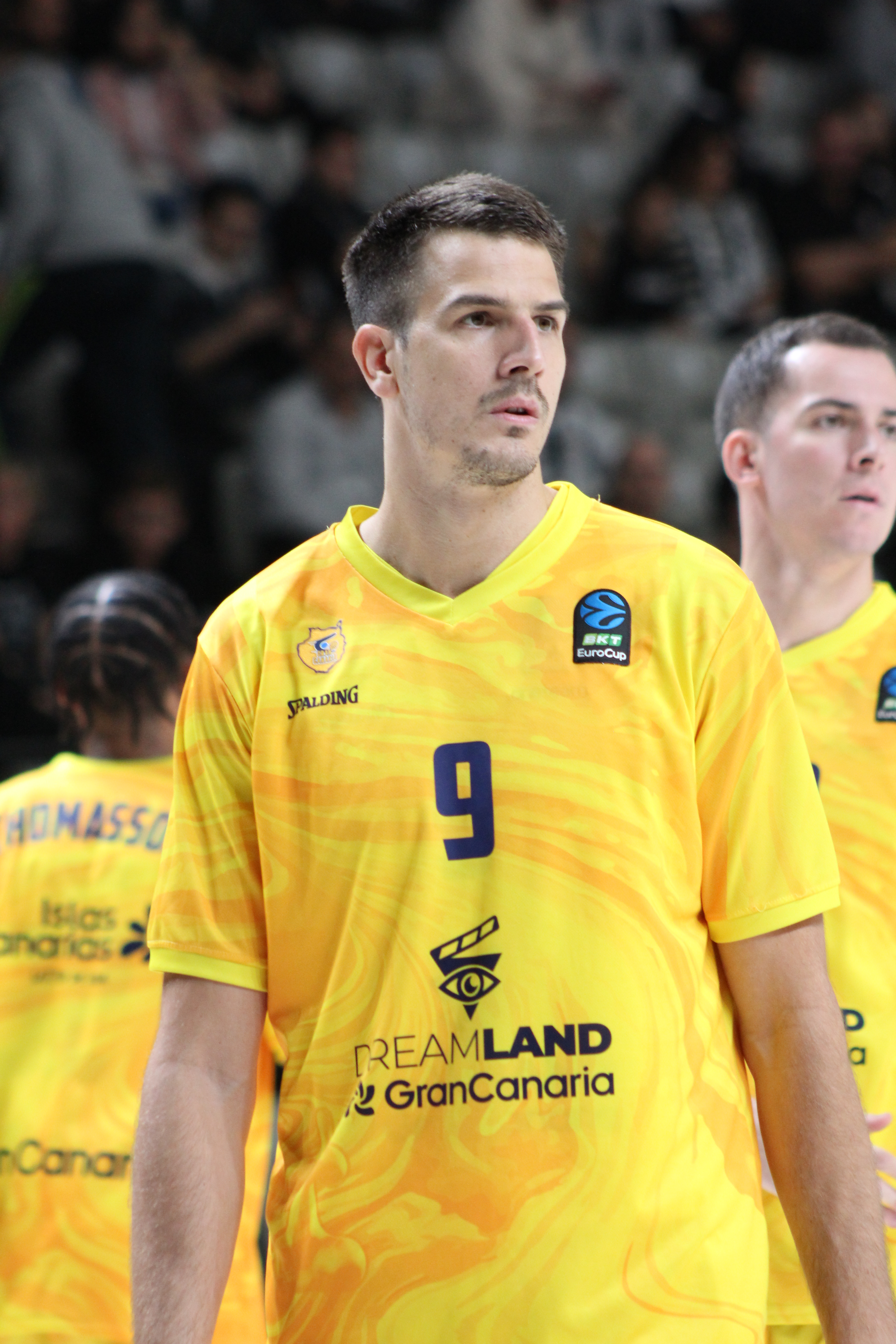
- Brussino with Gran Canaria in 2024

No. 9 – Basket Zaragoza
- Position: Small forward
- League: Liga ACB

Personal information
- Born: 2 March 1993 (age 33) Cañada de Gómez, Argentina
- Listed height: 2.01 m (6 ft 7 in)
- Listed weight: 88 kg (195 lb)

Career information
- NBA draft: 2015: undrafted
- Playing career: 2010–present

Career history
- 2010–2012: San Martín de Marcos Juárez
- 2012–2015: Regatas Corrientes
- 2015–2016: Peñarol
- 2016–2017: Dallas Mavericks
- 2017: →Texas Legends
- 2017: Atlanta Hawks
- 2017: →Erie BayHawks
- 2018: Gran Canaria
- 2018–2019: Canarias
- 2019–2021: Zaragoza
- 2021–2026: Gran Canaria
- 2026–present: Zaragoza

Career highlights
- EuroCup champion (2023); All-Liga ACB Second Team (2024); Argentine League Best Sixth Man (2015); Argentine League champion (2013)
- Stats at NBA.com
- Stats at Basketball Reference
Medals
Men's basketball
Representing Argentina
World Cup
Silver medal – second place	2019 China
FIBA AmeriCup
Gold medal – first place	2022 Brazil
Silver medal – second place	2015 Mexico City
Silver medal – second place	2017 Argentina
Silver medal – second place	2025 Managua
Pan American Games
Gold medal – first place	2019 Lima

Nicolás "Nico" Brussino (born 2 March 1993) is an Argentine-Italian professional basketball player for Zaragoza of the Spanish Liga ACB. He also represents the senior Argentine national team in international competition. Standing at 2.01 m (6 ft 7 in), he plays at the small forward position.

== Professional career ==
=== Regatas Corrientes (2012–2015) ===
After two years playing for San Martín de Marcos Juárez, Brussino joined Regatas Corrientes on July 22, 2012. Before the 2012–13 season, it was discovered that Brussino had a heart problem. This congenital disease saw an abnormal electrical connection between the atria and ventricles. Despite this, he still managed 29 games for Corrientes, averaging 1.9 points and 1.1 rebounds per game, while helping Corrientes win the 2012–13 LNB championship.

In 2013–14, Brussino averaged 6.0 points and 2.6 rebounds in 55 games, and in 2014–15, he again played in 55 games and averaged 9.4 points, 3.2 rebounds, and 1.3 assists per game.

=== Peñarol (2015–2016) ===
On August 1, 2015, Brussino signed with Peñarol. In 2015–16, he averaged 14.6 points, 5.5 rebounds, 3.1 assists and 1.5 steals in 59 games.

=== Dallas Mavericks (2016–2017) ===
On July 15, 2016, Brussino signed with the Dallas Mavericks. He made his NBA debut in the Mavericks' season opener on October 26, 2016, recording one assist in 34 seconds of game time in a 130–121 overtime loss to the Indiana Pacers. On March 15, 2017, he scored eight of his season-high 11 points in the fourth quarter of the Mavericks' 112–107 win over the Washington Wizards. He also had nine rebounds in the game while playing 23 minutes off the bench. On April 4, 2017, he had a season-high 13 points along with seven rebounds and five assists in a 98–87 loss to the Sacramento Kings. During his rookie season, he had multiple assignments with the Texas Legends of the NBA Development League. On July 20, 2017, he was waived by the Mavericks.

=== Atlanta Hawks (2017) ===
On July 22, 2017, Brussino was claimed off waivers by the Atlanta Hawks. On December 8, 2017, he was waived by the Hawks after appearing in four games. He also appeared in eight contests with the Erie BayHawks, Atlanta's NBA G League affiliate.

=== Herbalife Gran Canaria (2018) ===
On 31 December 2017, Brussino signed with Spanish club Herbalife Gran Canaria for the rest of the 2017–18 season.

=== Iberostar Tenerife (2018–2019) ===
On July 26, 2018, Brussino signed a one–plus–one deal with Iberostar Tenerife of the Liga ACB.

=== Basket Zaragoza (2019–2021) ===
On July 5, 2019, Brussino signed a two-year deal with Basket Zaragoza of the Liga ACB. He averaged 9.8 points and 4 rebounds during the 2019–20 season. On June 12, 2020, Brussino re-signed with the team.

=== Return to Herbalife Gran Canaria (2021–2026) ===
On July 1, 2021, he joined Herbalife Gran Canaria of the Spanish Liga ACB.

=== Return to Zaragoza (2026–present) ===
On July 12, 2026, Brussino returned to Zaragoza, signing a two-season deal.

== National team career ==
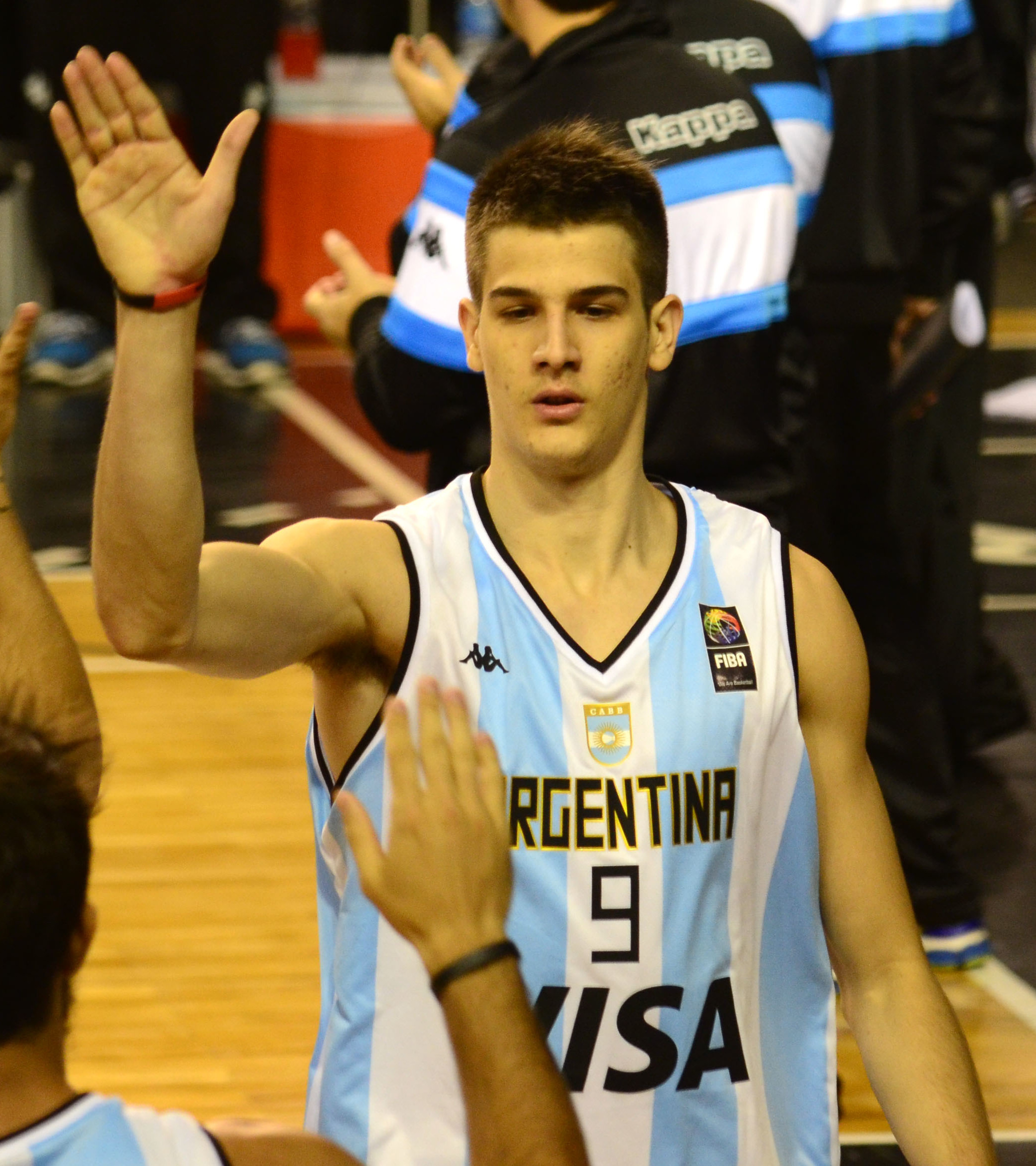
Brussino in 2015

Brussino is a senior Argentine national basketball team member. He won a silver medal with Argentina's senior national team at the 2015 FIBA Americas Championship. He also played at the 2016 Summer Olympics, and at the 2017 FIBA AmeriCup, where he won a silver medal and was named to the All-Tournament Team.

In 2019, he participated in the team that won the Pan American gold medal in Lima. He was included in the Argentine squad for the 2019 FIBA Basketball World Cup and clinched the silver medal with Argentina, which emerged as runners-up to Spain at the 2019 FIBA Basketball World Cup.

In 2022, Brussino won the gold medal in the 2022 FIBA AmeriCup held in Recife, Brazil. He was one of Argentina's small forwards in the tournament.

== NBA career statistics ==
Legend
GP	Games played	GS	Games started	MPG	Minutes per game
FG%	Field goal percentage	3P%	3-point field goal percentage	FT%	Free throw percentage
RPG	Rebounds per game	APG	Assists per game	SPG	Steals per game
BPG	Blocks per game	PPG	Points per game	**Bold**	Career high

=== Regular season ===
Year	Team	GP	GS	MPG	FG%	3P%	FT%	RPG	APG	SPG	BPG	PPG
2016–17	Dallas	54	2	9.6	.369	.305	.773	1.7	.9	.3	.1	2.8
2017–18	Atlanta	4	0	2.5	.000	.000	.000	0.8	.0	.0	.0	.0
Career		58	2	9.2	.364	.299	.773	1.7	.8	.3	.1	2.6

== Personal life ==
Brussino, who has Italian ancestry (the surname was originally Bruscino), received Italian citizenship. Brussino's brother, Juan, also plays basketball in Argentina.
