= Trade Union Sport Palace =

Indoor sporting arena in Nizhny Novgorod

KRK "Nagorny"
- КРК «Нагорный»
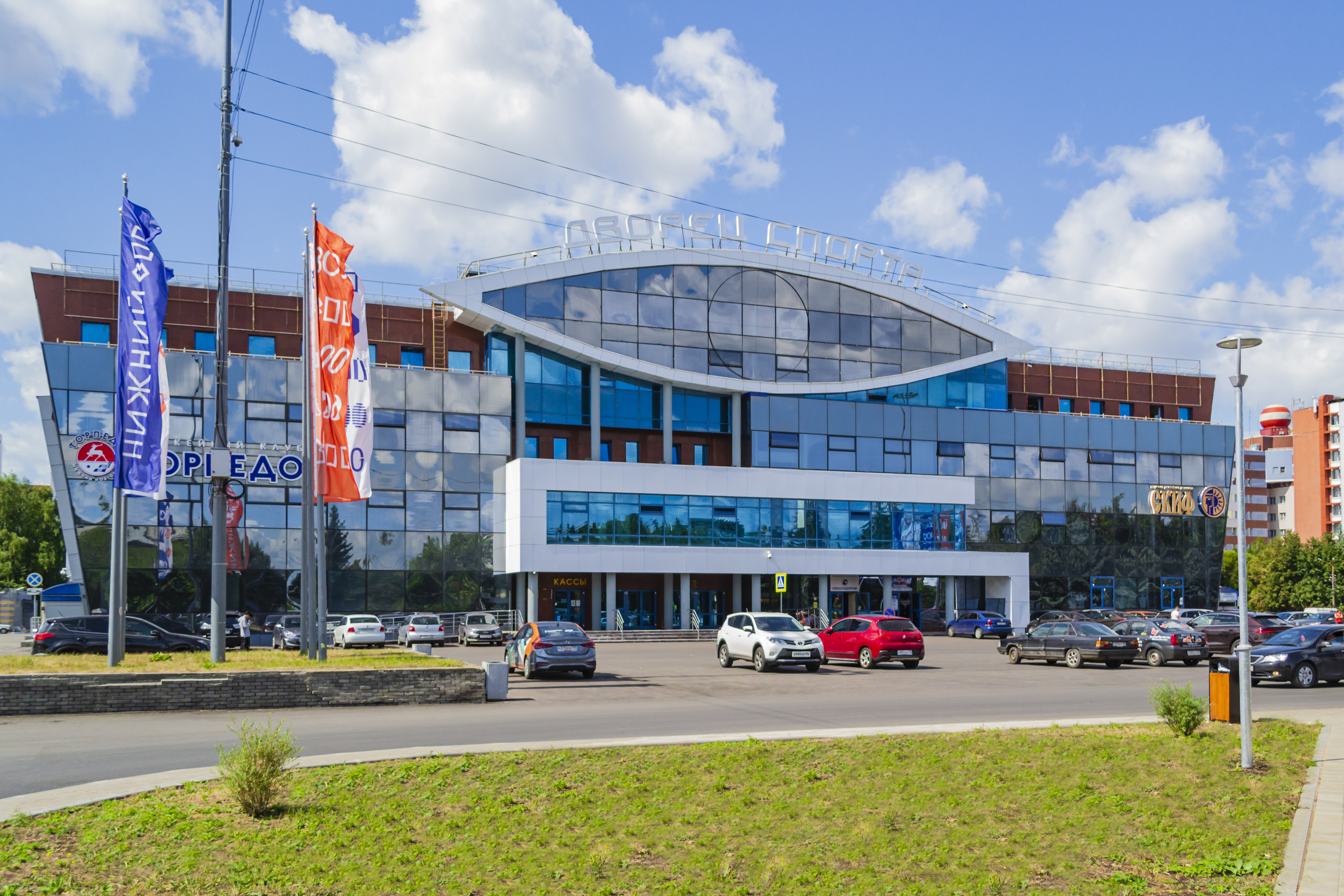
- Trade in 2013
- Interactive map of KRK "Nagorny"
- Full name: Culture and Entertainment Complex Nagorny
- Former names: Nizhny Novgorod Trade Union Sports Palace; Nagorny Sports Palace
- Address: Avenue Gagarina, 29; Nizhny Novgorod; Russia
- Coordinates: 56°17′31″N 43°58′45″E
- Capacity: 5,500
- Surface: Concrete, ice Parquet
- Scoreboard: Four-sided, video
- Field size: Ice hockey: 30 m (98 ft) x 60 m (200 ft)

Construction
- Opened: 15 October 1965
- Renovated: 1974–75, 2007
- Expanded: 2007

Tenants
- Torpedo Nizhny Novgorod (KHL); Torpedo Nizhny Novgorod (ZhHL); Chaika Nizhny Novgorod (MHL); BC Nizhny Novgorod (VTB United League)

Website
- www.dvorecnn.ru

The Culture and Entertainment Complex Nagorny (Russian: Культурно-развлекательный комплекс Нагорный, romanized: Kul'turno-razvlekatel'nyy kompleks Nagornyy), abbreviated as CEC Nagorny or KRK Nagorny (КРК Нагорный), is an indoor sports and entertainment arena in the Sovetsky district of Nizhny Novgorod, Russia. It was previously called the Nizhny Novgorod Sports Palace of Trade Unions (Нижегородский Дворец спорта Профсоюзов) and the Nagorny Sports Palace (Нагорный Дворец спорта). First opened in 1965, the arena was extensively renovated and expanded in 2007. The name "Nagorny" means 'upland' and refers to the arena's location in Upper City (Russian: Наго́рная часть, romanized: Nagórnaya chast', lit. 'upland part') geographic area of Nizhny Novgorod.

== History ==
Trade Union Sport Palace opened on 15 October 1965. With a 3,500 seating capacity, it was the first indoor ice hockey arena of its scale to be constructed in a regional center of the Russian Soviet Federative Socialist Republic (RSFSR). After a devastating storm caused significant damage to the arena in July 1974, almost completely destroying the roof and demolishing many of the arena's floor-to-ceiling windowpanes, a nine-month reconstruction and modernization was undertaken. In subsequent years, the arena was used as an experimental engineering site in partnership with the Gorky Engineering and Construction Institute (now called the Nizhny Novgorod State University of Architecture and Construction), most notably for cooling technologies. This partnership resulted in several discoveries, including the development of an inhibitor for the coolant pipes in the concrete floor of the arena, which substantially slowed the rate of corrosion – allowing the pipes to survive for more than 20 years without replacement (in other arenas, pipes generally required replacement every 10–12 years).

In celebration of its 45th anniversary, the arena underwent a renovation and expansion in 2007. Its seating capacity was increased to 5,500, in accordance with the regulations of the Russian Superleague (reorganized as the Kontinental Hockey League (KHL) in 2008), and it replaced the V. S. Konovalenko Sports Palace as the home arena of Torpedo Nizhny Novgorod. The renovations also included a new ethylene glycol cooling system, a concrete foundation below the ice up to 120 cm (47 in) thick, and a heat-insulating covering carpet for the ice, which allows flooring for other sports or events to be installed on top without harming the ice surface. For the arena's 50th anniversary, in 2012, new lighting and security systems were added.

In 2006, the ice hockey team SKIF Nizhny Novgorod of the Russian Women's Hockey League (reorganized as the Zhenskaya Hockey League in 2015) relocated from Moscow to Nizhny Novgorod and the arena became their new home ice. After the 2007 renovation and expansion, the arena replaced the V. S. Konovalenko Sports Palace as home of Torpedo Nizhny Novgorod of the Russian Superleague (reorganized as the KHL in 2008). In addition to the ice hockey teams, the arena has been used as the home of the basketball team BC Nizhny Novgorod of the VTB United League since 2010.

== See also ==
- List of Kontinental Hockey League arenas
- List of indoor arenas in Russia
