= Amath M'Baye =

French basketball player (born 1989)

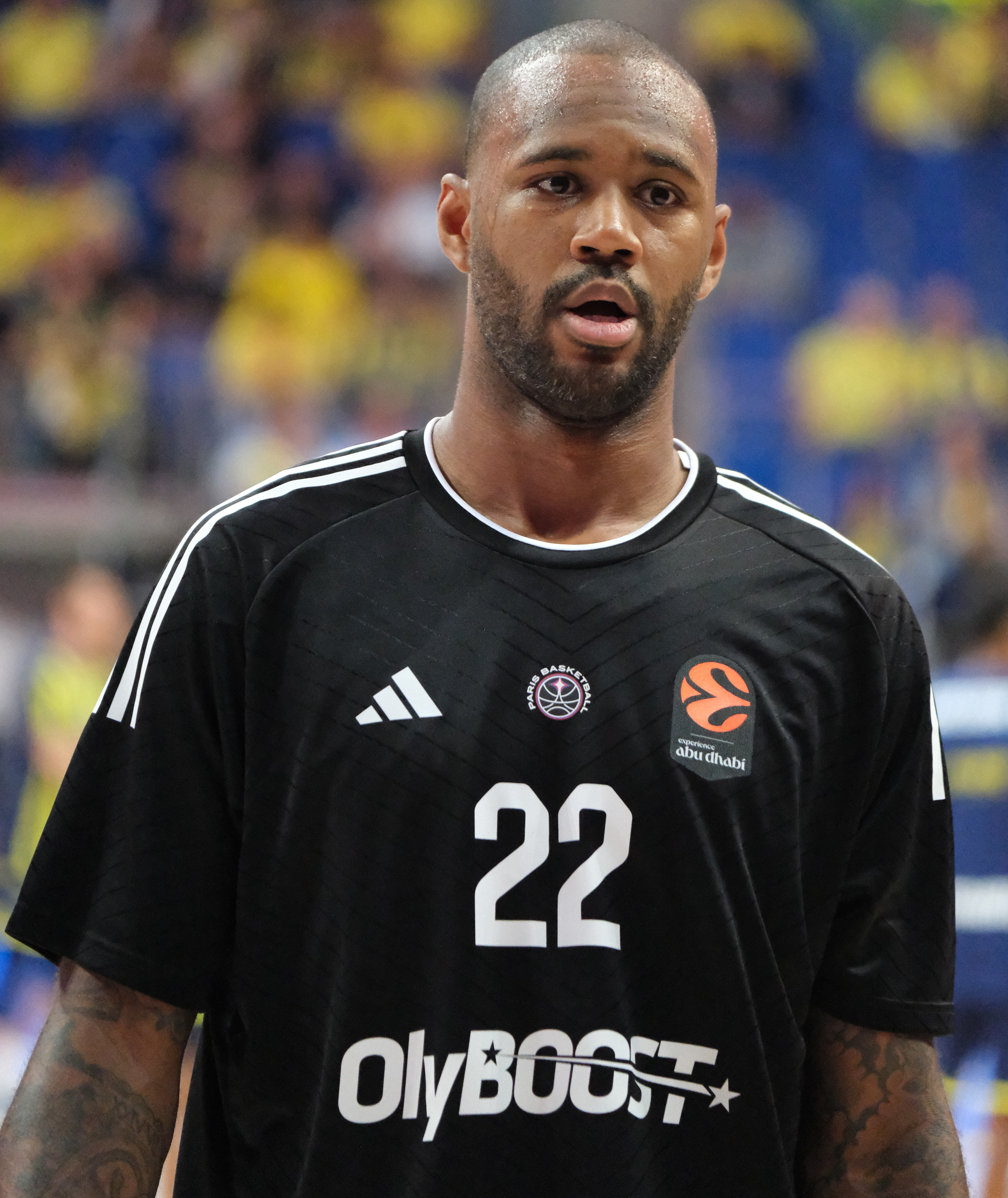
- M'Baye with Paris Basketball in 2025

No. 24 – CSKA Moscow
- Position: Power forward
- League: VTB United League

Personal information
- Born: 14 December 1989 (age 36) Bordeaux, France
- Listed height: 6 ft 9 in (2.06 m)
- Listed weight: 225 lb (102 kg)

Career information
- High school: Stoneridge Prep (Simi Valley, California)
- College: Wyoming (2009–2011); Oklahoma (2012–2013)
- NBA draft: 2013: undrafted
- Playing career: 2013–present

Career history
- 2013–2016: Nagoya Diamond Dolphins
- 2016–2017: New Basket Brindisi
- 2017–2018: Olimpia Milano
- 2018–2019: Virtus Bologna
- 2019–2022: Karşıyaka
- 2022–2023: Anadolu Efes
- 2023–2025: CSKA Moscow
- 2025–2026: Paris Basketball
- 2026–present: CSKA Moscow

Career highlights
- FIBA Champions League champion (2019); All-FIBA Champions League Second Team (2019); Italian League champion (2018); Italian Supercup winner (2017); Turkish League champion (2023); Turkish Super Cup winner (2022); 2× VTB United League champion (2024, 2025); VTB United League Supercup winner (2024)
- Stats at Basketball Reference
Medals
Men's basketball
Representing France
EuroBasket
Silver medal – second place	2022 Czech Republic–Georgia–Italy–Germany
FIBA World Cup
Bronze medal – third place	2019 China
FIBA Europe Under-20 Championship
Bronze medal – third place	2009 Greece

Amadou-Amath M'Baye (born 14 December 1989) is a French professional basketball player for CSKA Moscow of the VTB United League. Standing at 2.06 m (6 ft 9 in), he plays at the power forward position.

== Professional career ==
Born in France, M'Baye is of Senegalese descent. In the first two years as an NCAA men's basketball player, Amath M'Baye was in Wyoming. He averaged 12 points and 5.7 rebounds in 31 games. For that reason he received the individual award "All-MWC Honorable Mention". He later transferred to the Oklahoma Sooners where he played in the 2012–13 season (after sitting out one year, per NCAA transfer rules), having an average of 10.1 points and 5.1 rebounds per game. He was in the third-best quintet of the "All-Big12" and later in the best quintet of the "Big12 All-rookie".

M'Baye started his professional career in Japan with the Mitsubishi Diamond Dolphins for three seasons, from 2013 to 2016. During these three years, he averaged 20.2 points, 7.7 rebounds and 2.5 assists. During the 2014–15 season, he won the MVP award at the Japan All-Star Game and he was in the best quintet of the local league.

As a young player, Amath M'Baye was selected up for the 2009 FIBA Europe Under-20 Championship in Greece with the French national basketball team, winning the silver medal.

In 2016, the French player signed a contract with the Italian basketball team New Basket Brindisi, and he will take part to the 2016–17 LBA season.

On 26 July 2019 he signed a contract with Pınar Karşıyaka of the Turkish Basketbol Süper Ligi. M'Baye averaged 11.7 points, 3.6 rebounds and 2.8 assists per game during the 2019–2020 season. On July 3, 2020, he re-signed with the team. M'Baye averaged 16.1 points, 3.7 rebounds, and 1.8 assists per game. He re-signed with Pınar Karşıyaka on August 10, 2021.

On June 2, 2022, he signed with Anadolu Efes of the Basketbol Süper Ligi (BSL). In 33 EuroLeague games, he averaged 7 points and 2.8 rebounds, playing around 21 minutes per contest. On June 26, 2023, he parted ways with the Turkish powerhouse.

On June 30, 2023, he signed with CSKA Moscow of the VTB United League.

On July 2, 2025, he signed with Paris Basketball of the LNB Pro A.

== Career statistics ==
Legend
GP	Games played	GS	Games started	MPG	Minutes per game
FG%	Field-goal percentage	3P%	3-point field-goal percentage	FT%	Free-throw percentage
RPG	Rebounds per game	APG	Assists per game	SPG	Steals per game
BPG	Blocks per game	PPG	Points per game	PIR	Performance index rating
**Bold**	Career high

=== EuroLeague ===
*	Led the league

Year	Team	GP	GS	MPG	FG%	3P%	FT%	RPG	APG	SPG	BPG	PPG	PIR
2017–18	Milano	30	10	17.7	.463	.379	.791	2.0	**.9**	**.4**	.1	6.1	5.1
2022–23	Anadolu Efes	**33**	**15**	**21.5**	**.521**	**.517***	**.850**	**2.8**	.5	.3	**.3**	**7.0**	**7.2**
Career		63	25	19.7	.493	.458	.819	2.4	.7	.3	.2	6.6	6.2

== Honours and titles ==
=== Club ===
Olimpia Milano

- Lega Basket Serie A: 2017–18
- Italian Supercup: 2017

Virtus Bologna

- Basketball Champions League: 2018–19

ЦСКА Москва

- VTB United League: 2023–24, 2024–25

=== International ===
Italy Under-20

- European U20 Championship: 2009 Greece Bronze

=== Individual ===
- All-Champions League Second Team: 2018–19
- NBL Best Quintet: 2014–15
- NBL All-Star Game MVP: 2015
