= CB San Pablo Burgos =

San Pablo Burgos
- Leagues: Liga ACB; EuroCup
- Founded: 1994 (2015: professional team)
- History: CB Miraflores (1994–2020); CB San Pablo Burgos (2020–present)
- Arena: Coliseum Burgos
- Capacity: 9,604
- Location: Burgos, Spain
- Team colors: Blue, white and orange
- President: Félix Sancho
- Head coach: Porfirio Fisac
- Ownership: Grupo San Pablo
- Championships: 1 Intercontinental Cup; 2 Champions League; 1 Primera FEB; 1 Spain Cup
- Website: sanpabloburgos.com
Home	Away	Third

Club Baloncesto San Pablo Burgos, S.A.D., previously known as Club Baloncesto Miraflores and commonly known as San Pablo Burgos, is a professional basketball team based in Burgos, Spain and plays in the Coliseum Burgos. The team currently plays in the Spanish Liga ACB and the EuroCup. The club's biggest success has been winning the Basketball Champions League in 2020 and in 2021.

== History ==
Founded in 1994, CB Miraflores played its first years in the provincial league of Burgos. Its professional team was created in August 2015 with the aim to replace CB Tizona, which could not promote to Liga ACB at the end of the 2014–15 season, as the main club of the city.

On 28 August 2015, after the resignation of Tizona to continue playing in the league for focusing their efforts in their trial against the ACB, the club was admitted in LEB Oro. Miraflores set the successful Baskonia as a model of sports management.

In its second season, the club qualified for the Copa Princesa de Asturias and promoted to Liga ACB on 10 June 2017, after winning the promotion playoffs without losing any game. Miraflores achieved the fourth promotion for the city of Burgos in five years after the two times of CB Atapuerca in 2013 and 2014 and CB Tizona in 2016; but no one of them finally could meet the requirements for playing in the top tier. With the admission in the new league, Miraflores moved from Polideportivo El Plantío, with only 2,500 seats, to the Coliseum Burgos, that has a capacity for 9,500 people.

The club achieved its first victory in the top league on 11 November 2017, after seven consecutive losses, by beating UCAM Murcia at home, by 89–86, and finished their debut season in the 14th position with 13 wins out of 34 matches.

=== Back-to-back Champions League titles (2020–2022) ===
Two years later, Miraflores made its debut in European competitions by defeating Kyiv-Basket in the second qualifying round of the 2019–20 Basketball Champions League. After advancing to the regular season and later playoffs, Burgos qualified for the Final Eight. Played in Athens, San Pablo Burgos defeated the host team AEK in the final by 85–74. The team was crowned BCL champions, just five years after the professional club had been established. Thad McFadden, who scored 18 points in the final, was awarded the Final Eight MVP award.

As the winners of the BCL, Burgos represented Europe in the 2021 FIBA Intercontinental Cup, where it defeated Argentine club Quimsa in Buenos Aires to win the world club title. Burgos won the game 85-73, behind star point guard Vítor Benite who added 19 points and claimed the tournament's MVP award.

The following season, the 2020–21, Burgos had another impressive run after qualifying for the Final Eight with a 9–3 record in the first two group phases. On May 9, Burgos won its second Champions League title after winning the final in Nizhny Novgorod, defeating Turkish club Karşıyaka 64–59. Vítor Benite was named the league's final stage MVP. As winners of another Champions League, the team also qualified for a second Intercontinental Cup in 2022. During the 2021–22 ACB season, Burgos struggled from a lack of coaching; three coaches were signed during the season to find a way to avoid relegation. However, they ended 18th and were relegated to LEB Oro for the following season and it might be a end of the European glory.

Burgos returned to Liga ACB after a three-year hiatus in the Spanish second division. In the 2024–25 Primera FEB season, the team promoted as a top seed.

== Sponsorship naming ==
- San Pablo Inmobiliaria Burgos (2015–2017)
- San Pablo Burgos (2017–2020)
- Hereda San Pablo Burgos (2020–2023)
- Longevida San Pablo Burgos (2023–2024)
- Silbö San Pablo Burgos (2024–2025)
- Recoletas Salud San Pablo Burgos (2025–present)

== Logos ==
Non-commercial logo

Sponsorship logo used since promotion to ACB in 2017

== Head coaches ==
Nat.	Name	Period	Pld	W	L	PCT
(Spanish Basketball Federation)	Andreu Casadevall	2015	9	5	4	.556
(Spanish Basketball Federation)	Diego Epifanio	2015–2019	142	78	64	.549
(Spanish Basketball Federation)	Joan Peñarroya	2019–2021	105	65	40	.619
(Croatian Basketball Federation)	Žan Tabak	2021	13	5	8	.385
(Spanish Basketball Federation)	Félix Alonso	2021	2	1	1	.500
(Spanish Basketball Federation)	Salva Maldonado	2021–2022	9	5	4	.556
(Spanish Basketball Federation)	Paco Olmos	2022	35	15	20	.429
(Spanish Basketball Federation)	Curro Segura	2022–2023	27	18	9	.667
(Spanish Basketball Federation)	Lolo Encinas	2023–2024	28	20	8	.714
(Spanish Basketball Federation)	Jota Cuspinera	2024	10	9	1	.900
(Brazilian Basketball Confederation) (Italian Basketball Federation)	Bruno Savignani	2024–2025	51	40	10	.784
(Spanish Basketball Federation)	Porfirio Fisac	2025–present	25	11	14	.440

== Players ==
=== Current roster ===
Note: Flags indicate national team eligibility at FIBA-sanctioned events. Players may hold other non-FIBA nationalities not displayed.

San Pablo Burgos roster
Players
Coaches

Pos.	No.	Nat.	Name	Ht.	Age
C	0	(Senegal)	Mbengue, Code	2.08 m (6 ft 10 in)	18 – 4 March 2008
SG	1	(Jamaica)	Audige, Chase	1.93 m (6 ft 4 in)	27 – 29 June 1999
PG	2	(Guinea)	Evans, Shannon	1.85 m (6 ft 1 in)	32 – 19 July 1994
PG	4	(United States)	Steward, DJ	1.88 m (6 ft 2 in)	25 – 2 October 2001
PG	5	(Slovenia)	Samar, Žiga	1.97 m (6 ft 6 in)	25 – 26 January 2001
C	7	(Serbia)	Koprivica, Balša	2.16 m (7 ft 1 in)	26 – 1 May 2000
SF	8	(Spain)	Almazán, Pablo (C)	2.00 m (6 ft 7 in)	37 – 15 January 1989
PF	11	(Spain)	Díez, Dani	2.01 m (6 ft 7 in)	33 – 7 April 1993
C	12	(Spain)	Guerrero, Rubén	2.13 m (7 ft 0 in)	31 – 22 October 1995
SF	15	(Serbia)	Radosavljević, Dušan	2.01 m (6 ft 7 in)	25 – 3 November 2001
SF	20	(Spain)	Rodriguez, Ramiro	1.96 m (6 ft 5 in)	20 – 7 January 2006
SF	31	(Slovenia)	Čančar, Vlatko (injured)	2.01 m (6 ft 7 in)	29 – 10 April 1997
SG	32	(Belgium)	Obasohan, Retin	1.91 m (6 ft 3 in)	33 – 6 July 1993
PF	43	(Germany)	Sengfelder, Christian	2.03 m (6 ft 8 in)	31 – 28 February 1995
F/C	45	(France)	Doumbouya, Sekou	2.06 m (6 ft 9 in)	25 – 23 December 2000
SG	55	(Spain)	Lobaco, Raúl	1.90 m (6 ft 3 in)	25 – 29 November 2000
SF	59	(Uruguay)	Taboada, Joaquín	1.91 m (6 ft 3 in)	19 – 5 June 2007

Head coach

- (Spanish Basketball Federation) Porfirio Fisac

Assistant coach(es)

- (Spanish Basketball Federation) Jorge Álvarez
- (Spanish Basketball Federation) Juan José Nieto
- (Spanish Basketball Federation) Carles Leal

Legend

- (C) Team captain
- Injured

- Roster
- Transactions
Updated: November 20, 2026

=== Depth chart ===
Pos.	Starting 5	Bench 1	Bench 2	Inactive
C	Balša Koprivica	Sekou Doumbouya	Rubén Guerrero †
PF	Christian Sengfelder	Dani Díez †
SF	Dušan Radosavljević	Joaquín Taboada *	Pablo Almazán †	Vlatko Čančar (injured)
SG	Chase Audige	Raúl Lobaco †
PG	DJ Steward *	Žiga Samar †	Shannon Evans	Retin Obasohan (injured)

Notes: Blue † – homegrown player; (Note: A homegrown player is a player that played for at least three years before the age of 20 on a Spanish team. In Liga ACB, the team must register at least four homegrown players in rosters of 10–12 players or at least three homegrown players in rosters of 8–9 players. In EuroCup, the team did not have any limitations regarding the number of homegrown players.) Red * – overseas player; (Note: An overseas player is a player from outside EEA, FIBA Europe or ACP states. In Liga ACB, the team may register at most two overseas players. In EuroCup, the team did not have any limitations regarding the number of overseas players.) Green ‡ – youth player (Note: In Liga ACB, the team may register under-22 players linked to the youth system.)

== Season by season ==
Season	Tier	Division	Pos.	W–L	Copa del Rey	Other cups		European competitions		
2015–16	2	LEB Oro	4th	22–17						
2016–17	2	LEB Oro	2nd	33–10		Copa Princesa	RU			
2017–18	1	Liga ACB	14th	13–21						
2018–19	1	Liga ACB	11th	15–19						
2019–20	1	Liga ACB	4th	15–14				3 Champions League	C	13–6
2020–21	1	Liga ACB	6th	22–16	Quarterfinalist	Intercontinental Cup	C	3 Champions League	C	12–3
2021–22	1	Liga ACB	18th	10–24		Intercontinental Cup	RU	3 Champions League	PI	5–4
2022–23	2	LEB Oro	3rd	26–13						
2023–24	2	LEB Oro	4th	29–9						
2024–25	2	Primera FEB	1st	32–2		Spain Cup	C			
2025–26	1	Liga ACB	13th	12–22						

== Trophies and awards ==
=== Domestic competitions ===
- Primera FEB
  - Champions (1): 2024–25
- Spain Cup
  - Champions (1): 2024–25
- Copa Princesa de Asturias (Spanish Princess' Cup) (defunct)
  - Runners-up (1): 2017

=== Worldwide competitions ===
- Intercontinental Cup
  - Champions (1): 2021
  - Runners-up (1): 2022

=== European competitions ===
- Champions League
  - Champions (2): 2019–20, 2020–21

=== Regional competitions ===
- Copa Castilla y León
  - Champions (3): 2016, 2017, 2018
- Burgos, Spain Invitational Game
  - Champions (1): 2020

== Notable players ==
Note: Flags indicate national team eligibility at FIBA-sanctioned events. Players may hold other non-FIBA nationalities not displayed.

Criteria

To appear in this section a player must have either:

- Set a club record or won an individual award while at the club
- Played at least one official international match for their national team at any time
- Played at least one official NBA match at any time.

- (Austria) Anton Maresch
- (Austria) Thomas Schreiner
- (Brazil) Vítor Benite
- (Ivory Coast) Deon Thompson
- (Cuba) Jasiel Rivero
- (United Kingdom) (United States) Tarik Phillip
- (Iceland) Ægir Steinarsson
- (Lithuania) Deividas Gailius
- (Lithuania) Augustas Pečiukevičius
- (Lithuania) Tadas Sedekerskis
- (Lithuania) Justas Sinica
- (Spain) Sebas Saiz
- (United States) Corey Fisher
- (United States) (Israel) Max Heidegger
- (United States) John Jenkins

== Reserve team ==
On 14 December 2016, Miraflores agreed a collaboration with local Liga EBA club Basket Burgos 2002, that became their reserve team. In 2018, Basket Burgos 2002 was integrated in the structure of the club.
