= Basketball Champions League records and statistics =

Map of countries, teams from which have reached the regular season of the Basketball Champions League. Country that has been represented in the regular season Country that has been represented in the qualifying rounds Not represented (As of the 2021–22 season)

This page details statistics of the Basketball Champions League. Unless notified these statistics concern all seasons since inception of the Champions League in the 2016–17 season, including qualifying rounds of the Basketball Champions League as per "Competition facts"; all matches before regular season count as "qualifying matches".

== General performances ==
=== By club ===
Club	Winners	Runners-up	Years won	Years runner-up
(Spain) Tenerife	2	2	2017, 2022	2019, 2024
(Spain) Unicaja Malaga	2	0	2024, 2025	–
(Spain) San Pablo Burgos	2	0	2020, 2021	–
(Greece) AEK	1	2	2018	2020, 2026
(Italy) Virtus Bologna	1	0	2019	–
(Germany) Baskets Bonn	1	0	2023	–
(Lithuania) Rytas Vilnius	1	0	2026	–
(Turkey) Bandırma	0	1	–	2017
(France) Monaco	0	1	–	2018
(Turkey) Karşıyaka	0	1	–	2021
(Spain) Manresa	0	1	–	2022
(Israel) Hapoel Jerusalem	0	1	–	2023
(Turkey) Galatasaray	0	1	–	2025

=== By nation ===
Country	Winners	Runners-up	Winning clubs	Runners-up
Spain	6	3	San Pablo Burgos (2), Canarias (2), Unicaja (2)	Canarias (2), Manresa (1)
Greece	1	2	AEK (1)	AEK (2)
Germany	1	0	Baskets Bonn (1)	
Italy	1	0	Virtus Bologna (1)	
Lithuania	1	0	Rytas Vilnius (1)	
Turkey	0	3		Bandırma (1), Pınar Karşıyaka (1), Galatasaray (1)
France	0	1		Monaco (1)
Israel	0	1		Hapoel Jerusalem (1)

=== Basketball Champions League Country Ranking ===
As of the end of the 2022–23 Basketball Champions League.

Rank	Country	Clubs in 2020-21	Total points in 2020-21	Average points in 2020-21	Clubs in 2021-22	Total points in 2021-22	Average points in 2021-22	Clubs in 2022-23	Total points in 2022-23	Average points in 2022-23	Total points after the 3-year circle
1	Spain	4	147	36.75	4	150	37.50	6	183	30.50	104.75
2	Germany	1	30	30.00	3	54	18.00	4	84	21.00	69.00
3	France	4	76	19.00	3	55	18.33	3	79	26.33	63.67
4	Turkey	5	109	21.80	5	18	23.60	5	89	17.80	63.20
5	Israel	3	45	15	3	59	19.67	3	85	28.33	63.00
6	Bosnia and Herzegovina	1	24	24.00	1	17	17.00	1	15	15.00	56.00
7	Czech Republic	1	36	36.00	2	13	6.50	2	13	6.50	49.00
8	Hungary	1	14	14.00	1	27	27.00	2	12	6.00	47.00
9	Greece	3	39	13.00	4	37	9.25	3	63	21.00	43.25
10	Italy	3	53	17.67	3	38	12.67	2	22	11.00	41.33
11	Romania	1	1	1.00	1	38	38.00	1	2	2.00	41.00
12	Russia	1	33	33.00	2	15	7.50	0	0	0.00	40.50
13	Latvia	1	18	18.00	1	12	12.00	1	8	8.00	38.00
14	Belgium	2	13	6.50	2	22	11.00	1	17	17.00	34.50
15	Lithuania	2	13	6.50	2	30	15.00	2	26	13.00	34.50
16	Ukraine	1	11	1.00	1	23	23.00	1	2	2.00	26.00
17	Denmark	1	14	14.00	1	2	2.00	1	8	8.00	24.00
18	Portugal	1	2	2.00	1	1	1.00	1	18	18.00	21.00
19	Poland	2	6	3.00	1	8	8.00	1	8	8.00	19.00
20	Belarus	1	11	11.00	1	4	4.00	0	0	0.00	15.00
21	Estonia	0	0	0.00	1	11	11.00	1	1	1.00	12.00
22	Cyprus	1	5	5.00	1	1	1.00	1	2	2.00	8.00
23	Switzerland	1	1	1.00	1	4	4.00	1	2	2.00	7.00
24	Netherlands	1	2	2.00	1	2	2.00	1	2	2.00	6.00
25	Slovakia	0	0	0.00	0	0	0.00	1	4	4.00	4.00
26	Serbia	0	0	0.00	0	0	0.00	1	4	4.00	4.00
27	Finland	0	0	0.00	1	1	1.00	1	2	2.00	3.00
28	(United Kingdom) Great Britain	1	1	11.00	1	1	1.00	1	1	1.00	3.00
29	Austria	0	0	0.00	1	1	1.00	1	2	2.00	3.00
30	Croatia	0	0	0.00	1	2	2.00	0	0	0.00	2.00
31	Montenegro	0	0	0.00	1	2	2.00	0	0	0.00	2.00
32	Bulgaria	1	1	1.00	1	1	1.00	0	0	0.00	2.00
33	Sweden	0	0	0.00	0	0	0.00	1	1	1.00	1.00
34	North Macedonia	0	0	0.00	0	0	0.00	1	1	1.00	1.00
35	Kosovo	0	0	0.00	0	0	0.00	1	1	1.00	1.00

=== Basketball Champions League Top-50 Club Ranking ===
As of the end of the 2022–23 Basketball Champions League.

Rank	Country	Total points in 2020-21	Total points in 2021-22	Total points in 2022-23	Total points after the 3-year circle
1	(Spain) Tenerife	36	53	46	135
2	(France) SIG Strasbourg	37	28	35	100
3	(Israel) Hapoel Holon	33	41	24	98
4	(Spain) Manresa	0	48	33	81
5	(Israel) Hapoel Jerusalem	11	17	50	78
6	(Spain) Unicaja Malaga	0	29	46	75
7	(Spain) San Pablo Burgos	53	20	0	73
8	(Turkey) Karşiyaka	42	17	12	71
9	(Turkey) Tofaş	24	33	12	69
10	(Greece) AEK	27	8	32	67
11	(France) JDA Dijon	17	25	23	65
12	(Germany) Ludwigsbourg	0	44	20	64
13	(Lithuania) Rytas Vilnius	11	26	25	62
14	(Turkey) Galatasaray	8	27	26	61
15	(Czech Republic) Nymburk	36	11	11	58
16	(Germany) Bonn	0	00	56	56
17	(Bosnia and Herzegovina) Igokea	24	17	15	56
18	(Hungary) Falco Szombathely	14	27	11	52
19	(Turkey) Darüşşafaka	8	24	20	52
20	(Belgium) Oostende	11	21	17	49
21	(Spain) Zaragoza	47	0	0	47
22	(Russia) Nizhny Novgorod	33	11	0	44
23	(Italy) Dinamo Sassari	21	8	11	40
24	(Romania) U-BT Cluj-Napoca	1	38	0	39
25	(Latvia) VEF Rīga	18	12	8	38
26	(Germany) Brose Bamberg	30	2	4	36
27	(Italy) New Basket Brindisi	27	8	0	35
28	(Spain) Bilbao	11	0	24	35
29	(Spain) UCAM Murcia	0	0	33	33
30	(France) Limoges CSP	11	0	21	32
31	(Greece) Peristeri	11	2	17	30
32	(Turkey) Türk Telekom	27	0	0	27
33	(Greece) PAOK	0	12	14	26
34	(Denmark) Bakken Bears	14	2	8	24
35	(Ukraine) Prometey	0	23	0	23
36	(Italy) Universo Treviso	0	22	0	22
37	(Turkey) Bahçeşehir Koleji	0	0	19	19
38	(Portugal) Benfica	0	0	18	18
39	(Turkey) Beşiktaş J.K.	0	17	0	17
40	(Greece) Lavrio	0	15	0	15
41	(Belarus) Tsmoki-Minsk	11	4	0	15
42	(Israel) Bnei Herzliya Basket	0	0	11	11
43	(Estonia) Kalev	0	11	0	11
44	(France) Cholet	11	0	0	11
45	(Italy) Reggio Emilia	0	0	11	11
46	(Germany) Oldenburg	0	8	0	8
47	(Poland) Stal Ostrów Wielkopolski	0	8	0	8
48	(Poland) Legia Warsaw	0	0	8	8
49	(Switzerland) Fribourg Olympic	1	4	2	7
50	(Cyprus) Keravnos Strovolou	5	0	2	7

=== Number of participating clubs in the Basketball Champions League ===
The following is a list of clubs that have played in or qualified for the Champions League group stage.

Nation	No.	Clubs	Years
Turkey (15)	7	Karşıyaka	2016–17, 2017–18, 2020–21, 2021–22, 2022–23, 2023–24, 2024–25
Turkey (15)	7	Galatasaray	2020–21, 2021–22, 2022–23, 2023–24, 2024–25, 2025–26, 2026–27
Turkey (15)	5	Beşiktaş	2016–17, 2017–18, 2018–19, 2019–20, 2021–22
Turkey (15)	5	Tofaş	2020–21, 2021–22, 2022–23, 2023–24, 2025–26
Turkey (15)	4	Bandırma	2016–17, 2017–18, 2018–19, 2019–20
Turkey (15)	4	Darüşşafaka	2020–21, 2021–22, 2022–23, 2023–24
Turkey (15)	2	Gaziantep	2017–18, 2019–20
Turkey (15)	2	Türk Telekom	2019–20, 2020–21
Turkey (15)	2	Bursaspor	2023–24, 2025–26
Turkey (15)	1	Uşak Sportif	2016–17
Turkey (15)	1	Bahçeşehir Koleji	2022–23
Turkey (15)	1	Manisa BΒ	2024–25
Turkey (15)	1	Petkim Spor	2024–25
Turkey (15)	1	Mersin MSK	2025–26
Turkey (15)	1	Trabzonspor	2026–27
Italy (13)	7	Dinamo Sassari	2016–17, 2017–18, 2019–20, 2020–21, 2021–22, 2022–23, 2023–24
Italy (13)	3	Felice Scandone	2016–17, 2017–18, 2018–19
Italy (13)	3	Reyer Venezia	2016–17, 2017–18, 2018–19
Italy (13)	3	Brindisi	2019–20, 2020–21, 2021–22
Italy (13)	3	Reggiana	2022–23, 2024–25, 2026–27
Italy (13)	2	Derthona	2023–24, 2024–25
Italy (13)	2	Varese	2016–17, 2026–27
Italy (13)	1	Orlandina	2017–18
Italy (13)	1	Virtus Bologna	2018–19
Italy (13)	1	Fortitudo Bologna	2020–21
Italy (13)	1	Universo Treviso	2021–22
Italy (13)	1	Trapani Shark	2025–26
Italy (13)	1	Trieste	2025–26
Spain (12)	10	Canarias	2016–17, 2017–18, 2018–19, 2019–20, 2020–21, 2021–22, 2022–23, 2023–24, 2024–25, 2025–26
Spain (12)	6	Murcia	2017–18, 2018–19, 2022–23, 2023–24, 2024–25, 2026–27
Spain (12)	6	Málaga	2021–22, 2022–23, 2023–24, 2024–25, 2025–26, 2026–27
Spain (12)	4	Manresa	2019–20, 2021–22, 2022–23, 2024–25
Spain (12)	3	San Pablo Burgos	2019–20, 2020–21, 2021–22
Spain (12)	3	Bilbao	2020–21, 2022–23, 2026–27
Spain (12)	2	Zaragoza	2019–20, 2020–21
Spain (12)	2	Joventut Badalona	2025–26, 2026–27
Spain (12)	1	Estudiantes	2017–18
Spain (12)	1	Fuenlabrada	2018–19
Spain (12)	1	Breogán	2023–24
Spain (12)	1	Gran Canaria	2025–26
France (11)	9	Strasbourg	2016–17, 2017–18, 2018–19, 2019–20, 2020–21, 2021–22, 2022–23, 2023–24, 2026–27
France (11)	6	Dijon	2018–19, 2019–20, 2020–21, 2021–22, 2022–23, 2023–24
France (11)	4	Le Mans	2016–17, 2018–19, 2023–24, 2025–26
France (11)	4	Nanterre 92	2017–18, 2018–19, 2024–25, 2026–27
France (11)	4	Cholet	2020–21, 2023–24, 2025–26, 2026–27
France (11)	2	Monaco	2016–17, 2017–18
France (11)	2	Limoges	2020–21, 2022–23
France (11)	2	Élan Chalon	2017–18, 2025–26
France (11)	1	ASVEL	2016–17
France (11)	1	Élan Béarnais	2019–20
France (11)	1	Saint-Quentin	2024–25
Germany (11)	7	Bonn	2017–18, 2018–19, 2019–20, 2022–23, 2023–24, 2024–25, 2026–27
Germany (11)	6	Ludwigsburg	2016–17, 2017–18, 2018–19, 2021–22, 2022–23, 2023–24
Germany (11)	4	Oldenburg	2016–17, 2017–18, 2021–22, 2023–24
Germany (11)	4	Bamberg	2018–19, 2019–20, 2020–21, 2026–27
Germany (11)	3	Rasta Vechta	2019–20, 2024–25, 2026–27
Germany (11)	2	Bayreuth	2017–18, 2018–19
Germany (11)	2	Würzburg	2024–25, 2025–26
Germany (11)	2	Alba Berlin	2025–26, 2026–27
Germany (11)	1	Skyliners Frankfurt	2016–17
Germany (11)	1	Niners Chemnitz	2024–25
Germany (11)	1	USC Heidelberg	2025–26
Poland (9)	3	Legia Warsaw	2022–23, 2025–26, 2026–27
Poland (9)	2	Radom	2016–17, 2017–18
Poland (9)	2	Zielona Góra	2016–17, 2017–18
Poland (9)	2	Włocławek	2018–19, 2019–20
Poland (9)	2	Szczecin	2023–24, 2024–25
Poland (9)	1	Toruń	2019–20
Poland (9)	1	Start Lublin	2020–21
Poland (9)	1	Stal Ostrów Wielkopolski	2021–22
Poland (9)	1	Śląsk Wrocław	2024–25
Greece (8)	11	AEK	2016–17, 2017–18, 2018–19, 2019–20, 2020–21, 2021–22, 2022–23, 2023–24, 2024–25, 2025–26, 2026–27
Greece (8)	7	PAOK	2016–17, 2017–18, 2018–19, 2019–20, 2021–22, 2022–23, 2023–24
Greece (8)	6	Peristeri	2019–20, 2020–21, 2022–23, 2023–24, 2024–25, 2026–27
Greece (8)	4	Promitheas	2018–19, 2023–24, 2024–25, 2025–26
Greece (8)	2	Aris	2016–17, 2017–18
Greece (8)	1	Lavrio	2021–22
Greece (8)	1	Kolossos	2024–25
Greece (8)	1	Karditsa	2025–26
Israel (6)	10	Hapoel Holon	2017–18, 2018–19, 2019–20, 2020–21, 2021–22, 2022–23, 2023–24, 2024–25, 2025–26, 2026–27
Israel (6)	6	Hapoel Jerusalem	2018–19, 2019–20, 2020–21, 2021–22, 2022–23, 2023–24
Israel (6)	3	Bnei Herzliya	2022–23, 2025–26, 2026–27
Israel (6)	1	Ironi Nahariya	2016–17
Israel (6)	1	Maccabi Rishon LeZion	2016–17
Israel (6)	1	Maccabi Ironi Ramat Gan	2024–25
Lithuania (4)	7	Rytas	2020–21, 2021–22, 2022–23, 2023–24, 2024–25, 2025–26, 2026–27
Lithuania (4)	4	Neptūnas	2016–17, 2017–18, 2018–19, 2019–20
Lithuania (4)	3	Juventus	2016–17, 2017–18, 2026–27
Lithuania (4)	2	Lietkabelis	2018–19, 2019–20
Serbia (4)	2	Spartak Subotica	2025–26, 2026–27
Serbia (4)	1	Mega	2016–17
Serbia (4)	1	Partizan	2016–17
Serbia (4)	1	FMP	2024–25
Belgium (3)	10	Oostende	2016–17, 2017–18, 2018–19, 2019–20, 2020–21, 2021–22, 2022–23, 2023–24, 2024–25, 2025–26
Belgium (3)	3	Antwerp Giants	2018–19, 2019–20, 2026–27
Belgium (3)	1	Spirou Charleroi	2016–17
Czech Republic (3)	10	Nymburk	2016–17, 2017–18, 2018–19, 2019–20, 2020–21, 2021–22, 2022–23, 2024–25, 2025–26, 2026–27
Czech Republic (3)	2	Opava	2018–19, 2023–24
Czech Republic (3)	1	Pardubice	2026–27
Russia (3)	4	Nizhny Novgorod	2018–19, 2019–20, 2020–21, 2021–22
Russia (3)	1	Avtodor	2016–17
Russia (3)	1	Enisey	2017–18
Latvia (2)	7	VEF Rīga	2019–20, 2020–21, 2021–22, 2022–23, 2023–24, 2024–25, 2025–26
Latvia (2)	3	Ventspils	2016–17, 2017–18, 2018–19
Hungary (2)	7	Falco	2019–20, 2020–21, 2021–22, 2022–23, 2023–24, 2024–25, 2026–27
Hungary (2)	2	Szolnoki Olaj	2016–17, 2025–26
Portugal (2)	4	Benfica	2022–23, 2023–24, 2024–25, 2025–26
Portugal (2)	1	Porto	2026–27
Slovenia (2)	2	Olimpija	2017–18, 2018–19
Slovenia (2)	1	Helios Suns	2016–17
Romania (2)	1	Oradea	2016–17
Romania (2)	1	U Cluj-Napoca	2021–22
Ukraine (2)	1	Khimik	2016–17
Ukraine (2)	1	Prometey	2021–22
Finland (2)	1	Kataja	2016–17
Finland (2)	1	Vilpas Vikings	2026–27
Bosnia and Herzegovina (1)	7	Igokea	2020–21, 2021–22, 2022–23, 2023–24, 2024–25, 2025–26, 2026–27
Denmark (1)	3	Bakken Bears	2016–17, 2020–21, 2022–23
Montenegro (1)	2	Mornar	2016–17, 2019–20
Croatia (1)	2	Cibona	2016–17, 2026–27
Azerbaijan (1)	2	Sabah	2025–26, 2026–27
Switzerland (1)	1	Fribourg Olympic	2018–19
Belarus (1)	1	Tsmoki-Minsk	2020–21
Cyprus (1)	1	Keravnos	2020–21
Estonia (1)	1	Kalev	2021–22
Slovakia (1)	1	Patrioti Levice	2025–26

== Clubs ==
=== Performance review ===
==== Classification ====
**C**	Champion
RU	Runner-up
3rd	Third qualified
4th	Fourth qualified
QF	Eliminated in the quarterfinals
R16	Eliminated in round of 16
PI	Eliminated in the Play-ins
PQ	Eliminated in the playoffs qualifiers (2016–17 season)
RS	Eliminated in the regular season
•	Ongoing

==== Performance ====
Clubs (# of participations)		16–17	17–18	18–19	19–20	20–21	21–22	22–23
(France) **FRANCE (15)**		**(4)**	**(4)**	**(4)**	**(3)**	**(4)**	**(3)**	**(3)**
1	SIG Strasbourg (8)	PQ	QF	RS	RS	4th	QF	QF
2	Monaco (2)	3rd	RU					
3	Le Mans Sarthe (2)	R16		R16			QR	
4	Nanterre 92 (2)		R16	QF				
5	JDA Dijon (2)			RS	3rd	RS	R16	R16
6	ASVEL (1)	QF						
7	Élan Chalon (1)		RS					
8	Élan Béarnais (1)				RS			
(Germany) **GERMANY (14)**		**(3)**	**(4)**	**(4)**	**(3)**	**(1)**	**(2)**	
1	Riesen Ludwigsburg (3)	QF	4th	RS			3rd	PI
2	Bonn (3)		RS	RS	R16			**C**
3	Oldenburg (2)	R16	R16					
4	Bamberg (2)			4th	RS			
5	Bayreuth (1)		QF	RS				
6	Skyliners Frankfurt (1)	RS						
7	Rasta Vechta (1)				RS			
(Turkey) **TURKEY (14)**		**(4)**	**(4)**	**(2)**	**(4)**	**(5)**	**(4)**	
1	Bandırma (3)	RU	QF	R16	R16			
2	Beşiktaş (3)	R16	R16	R16	R16			
3	Karşıyaka (2)	QF	QF					
4	Gaziantep (2)		RS		RS			
5	Uşak Sportif (1)	RS						
6	Türk Telekom (1)				QF			
(Italy) **ITALY (13)**		**(4)**	**(4)**	**(3)**	**(2)**			
1	Felice Scandone (3)	R16	RS	RS				
2	Reyer Venezia (3)	4th	RS	R16				
3	Dinamo Sassari (3)	QF	RS		R16			
4	Varese (1)	RS						
5	Orlandina (1)		RS					
6	Virtus Bologna (1)			**C**				
7	Brindisi (1)				RS			
(Greece) **GREECE (12)**		**(3)**	**(3)**	**(3)**	**(3)**			
1	AEK (4)	R16	**C**	QF	RU			
2	PAOK (4)	R16	R16	R16	RS			
3	Aris (2)	R16	RS					
4	Promitheas (1)			R16				
5	Peristeri (1)				R16			
(Spain) **SPAIN (11)**		**(1)**	**(3)**	**(3)**	**(4)**			
1	Canarias (3)	**C**	R16	RU	QF			
2	Murcia (2)		3rd	R16				
3	Estudiantes (1)		RS					
4	Fuenlabrada (1)			RS				
5	Manresa (1)				RS			
6	San Pablo Burgos (1)				**C**			
7	Zaragoza (1)				4th			
(Lithuania) **LITHUANIA (8)**		**(2)**	**(2)**	**(2)**	**(2)**			
1	Neptūnas (4)	R16	R16	R16	RS			
2	Juventus (2)	PQ	RS					
3	Lietkabelis (2)			RS	R16			
(Belgium) **BELGIUM (7)**		**(2)**	**(1)**	**(2)**	**(2)**			
1	Oostende (4)	RS	RS	RS	R16			
2	Antwerp Giants (2)			3rd	RS			
3	Spirou (1)	RS						
(Israel) **ISRAEL (7)**		**(2)**	**(1)**	**(2)**	**(2)**			
1	Hapoel Holon (3)		RS	RS	RS			
2	Hapoel Jerusalem (2)			QF	QF			
3	Ironi Nahariya (1)	RS						
4	Maccabi Rishon LeZion (1)	PQ						
(Poland) **POLAND (7)**		**(2)**	**(2)**	**(1)**	**(2)**			
1	Radom (2)	RS	RS					
2	Zielona Góra (2)	RS	R16					
3	Włocławek (2)			RS	RS			
4	Toruń (1)				RS			
(Czech Republic) **CZECH REPUBLIC (5)**		**(1)**	**(1)**	**(2)**	**(1)**			
1	Nymburk (2)	PQ	R16	RS	QF			
2	Opava (1)			RS				
(Latvia) **LATVIA (4)**		**(1)**	**(1)**	**(1)**	**(1)**			
1	Ventspils (3)	PQ	RS	RS				
2	VEF Rīga (1)				RS			
(Russia) **RUSSIA (4)**		**(1)**	**(1)**	**(1)**	**(1)**			
1	Nizhny Novgorod (2)			QF	R16			
2	Avtodor (1)	PQ						
3	Enisey (1)		RS					
(Slovenia) **SLOVENIA (3)**		**(1)**	**(1)**	**(1)**	**(0)**			
1	Olimpija (2)		RS	RS				
2	Helios Suns (1)	RS						
(Hungary) **HUNGARY (2)**		**(1)**	**(0)**	**(0)**	**(1)**			
1	Szolnoki Olaj (1)	RS						
2	Falco (1)				RS			
(Montenegro) **MONTENEGRO (2)**		**(1)**	**(0)**	**(0)**	**(1)**			
1	Mornar (2)	RS			RS			
(Serbia) **SERBIA (2)**		**(2)**	**(0)**	**(0)**	**(0)**			
1	Mega (1)	RS						
2	Partizan (1)	PQ						
(Croatia) **CROATIA (1)**		**(1)**	**(0)**	**(0)**	**(0)**			
1	Cibona (1)	RS						
(Denmark) **DENMARK (1)**		**(1)**	**(0)**	**(0)**	**(0)**			
1	Bakken Bears (1)	RS						
(Finland) **FINLAND (1)**		**(1)**	**(0)**	**(0)**	**(0)**			
1	Kataja (1)	RS						
(Romania) **ROMANIA (1)**		**(1)**	**(0)**	**(0)**	**(0)**			
1	Oradea (1)	RS						
(Switzerland) **SWITZERLAND (1)**		**(0)**	**(0)**	**(1)**	**(0)**			
1	Fribourg Olympic (1)			RS				
(Ukraine) **UKRAINE (1)**		**(1)**	**(0)**	**(0)**	**(0)**			
1	Khimik (1)	RS						

=== By Final Four appearances ===
==== By club ====
Team	No.	Years
(Spain) Canarias	6	**2017**, **2019**, **2022**, 2023, **2024**, 2025
(Greece) AEK Athens	3	**2018**, **2020**, 2025
(Spain) Baloncesto Málaga	3	2023, **2024**, **2025**
(Spain) San Pablo Burgos	2	**2020**, **2021**
(Germany) Riesen Ludwigsburg	2	2018, 2022
(Spain) Zaragoza	2	2020, 2021
(France) Monaco	2	2017, **2018**
(Spain) Murcia	2	2018, 2024
(Belgium) Antwerp Giants	1	2019
(Turkey) Bandırma	1	**2017**
(Turkey) Karşıyaka	1	**2021**
(Italy) Reyer Venezia	1	2017
(Italy) Virtus Bologna	1	**2019**
(Germany) Bamberg	1	**2019**
(France) JDA Dijon	1	2020
(France) SIG Strasbourg	1	2021
(Spain) Manresa	2	**2022**
(Israel) Hapoel Holon	1	2022
(Israel) Hapoel Jerusalem	1	2023
(Germany) Telekom Baskets Bonn	1	2023
(Greece) Peristeri	1	2024
(Turkey) Galatasaray	1	**2025**

Team in Bold:	Finalist team in season

==== By nation ====
Nation	Winners	Runners-up	Third	Fourth	Total
Spain	6	3	4	3	16
Greece	1	1	1	1	4
Germany	1	0	1	2	4
France	0	1	2	1	4
Turkey	0	3	0	0	3
Italy	1	0	0	1	2
Israel	0	1	0	1	2
Belgium	0	0	1	0	1
Totals	9	9	9	9	36

== Game records ==
=== Biggest wins ===
- The largest overall difference in a match is +59, by Canarias against Opava (97–38) in the regular season 2018–19
- The largest difference in qualifying rounds is +43:
  - Riesen Ludwigsburg beat Bosna 59–102 (+43) in 2017–18
  - Nizhny Novgorod beat Porto 92–49 (+43) in 2018–19
- The following teams won a single match by 45 points or more in the regular season of the Basketball Champions League:
  - PAOK beat Opava 93–43 (+50) in 2018–19
  - Canarias beat Orlandina 59–106 (+47) in 2017–18
  - Nanterre 92 beat Bonn 103–56 (+47) in 2018–19
  - Canarias beat Mornar 103–57 (+46) in 2016–17
  - Nanterre 92 beat Opava 110–64 (+46) in 2018–19
- The following teams won a single match by 20 points or more in the playoffs of the Basketball Champions League:
  - Monaco beat Zielona Góra 90–60 (+30) in 2017–18
  - Canarias beat PAOK 80–54 (+26) in 2016–17
  - Riesen Ludwigsburg beat Oldenburg 63–88 (+25) in 2017–18
  - Dinamo Sassari beat Nymburk 94–72 (+22) in 2016–17
  - Monaco beat Riesen Ludwigsburg 65–87 (+22) in 2017–18, the largest difference in a Final Four
  - AEK beat Juventus 75–54 (+21) in 2016–17
  - Nymburk beat Dinamo Sassari 84–63 (+21) in 2016–17
  - Karşıyaka beat Skyliners Frankfurt 72–52 (+20) in 2016–17

=== Biggest two leg wins ===
- Nanterre 92 holds the overall record by beating Karhu 182–112 (+70) in the qualifying round in 2018–19. They beat the Finns by 54–91 and 91–58
- Riesen Ludwigsburg has the second overall record by beating Bosna 187–118 (+69) in the qualifying round in 2017–18. They beat the Bosnians by 59–85 and 102–59
- Aris has the third record by beating Dinamo Tbilisi 182–118 (+64) in the qualifying round in 2018–19. They beat the Georgians by 64–90 and 92–54
- As for the regular season, record belongs to Canarias, who beat Orlandina 194–106 (+88, 88–47 at home, 59–106 away) in 2017–18
- Monaco holds the biggest margin of overall home and away result in the Basketball Champions League era in playoffs. They beat Zielona Góra 174–142 (+32, 82–84 win away, 90–60, win at home) in the round of 16 in 2017–18

=== Most overtimes in a match ===
- Three matches were decided after playing three overtimes:
  - Radom beat PAOK 93–85 (6–6, 8–8, 14–6) in 2016–17
  - Reyer Venezia beat Bandırma 108–101 (11–11, 4–4, 13–6) in 2017–18
  - Hapoel Holon beat AEK 108-112 (13-13, 10-10, 8-12 ) in 2023-24

=== Highest scorings ===
- Nine teams scored more than 110 points in a game:
  - Hapoel Holon scored 122 points against Toruń (105–122) in the regular season in 2019–20
  - Manresa scored 121 points against Toruń (102–121) in the regular season in 2019–20
  - Bonn scored 114 points against Opava (114–77) in the regular season in 2018–19
  - Neptūnas scored 114 points against Gaziantep (114–73) in the regular season in 2017–18
  - Avtodor scored 113 points against Kataja (113–84) in the regular season in 2016–17
  - Dinamo Sassari scored 113 points against Toruń (95–113) in the regular season in 2019–20
  - Hapoel Jerusalem scored 112 points against Włocławek (112–94) in the regular season in 2019–20
  - Hapoel Holon scored 112 points against AEK (108-112) in the regular season in 2023-24
  - Reyer Venezia scored 111 points against Hapoel Holon (111–104) in the regular season in 2018–19
  - Hapoel Jerusalem scored 111 points against Nymburk (80–111) in the regular season in 2018–19

=== Lowest scorings ===
- Nine teams scored less than 50 points in a match:
  - Trapani Shark scored 5 points against Hapoel Holon (38-5) in the Play-In in 2025-26. This is the overall record for all Basketball Champions League matches.
  - Hapoel Holon scored 38 points against Trapani Shark (38-5) in the Play-In in 2025-26. This is the overall record for all Basketball Champions League matches for a winning team.
  - Opava scored 38 points against Canarias (97–38) in the regular season in 2018–19. This is the overall record overall for Basketball Champions League regular season.
  - Skyliners Frankfurt scored 47 points against Monaco (65–47) in the regular season in 2017–18
  - Orlandina scored 47 points against Canarias (88–47) in the regular season in 2017–18
  - Riesen Ludwigsburg scored 47 points against Murcia (63–47) in the regular season in 2018–19
  - Bandırma scored 48 points against Radom (49–48) in the regular season in 2017–18
  - Felice Scandone scored 49 points against Reyer Venezia (53–49) in the round of 16 in 2016–17. This is the overall record for the Basketball Champions League playoffs
  - Falco scored 49 points against Beşiktaş (74–49) in the regular season in 2019–20.

=== Most points in a match ===
- In ten matches, the overall scoring was more than 200 points:
  - Hapoel Holon beat 105–122 (227 points) Toruń in the regular season in 2019–20. This is the overall record for all Basketball Champions League matches.
  - Manresa beat 102–121 (223 points) Toruń in the regular season in 2019–20.
  - Hapoel Holon beat 108–112 (220 points) AEK in the regular season in 2023-24
  - Reyer Venezia beat 111–104 (215 points) Hapoel Holon in the regular season in 2018–19.
  - Reyer Venezia beat 108–101 (209 points) Bandırma in the regular season in 2017–18.
  - Nanterre 92 beat 102–106 (208 points) Felice Scandone in the regular season in 2017–18.
  - Dinamo Sassari beat 95–113 (208 points) Toruń in the regular season in 2019–20
  - Felice Scandone beat 105–102 (207 points) Włocławek in the regular season in 2018–19.
  - Hapoel Jerusalem beat 112–94 (206 points) Włocławek in the regular season in 2019–20
  - AEK beat 101–103 (204 points) Reyer Venezia in the regular season in 2017–18.
  - Nymburk beat Bonn by 106–98 (204 points) in the regular season in 2017–18. This is the overall record of a match without overtimes in all Basketball Champions League matches.
- AEK beat 94–100 (194 points) Monaco Basket in the final in 2017–18. This is the overall record for the Basketball Champions League playoffs
- Antwerp Giants beat 100–94 (194 points) Cantù in the qualifying round in 2018–19. This is the overall record for the Basketball Champions League qualifying rounds

=== Less points in a match ===
- Radom beat 49–48 (97 points) Bandırma in the regular season in 2017–18. This is the overall record for all the Basketball Champions League matches
- Reyer Venezia beat 53–49 (102 points) Felice Scandone in the round of 16 in 2016–17. This is the overall record for the Basketball Champions League playoffs
- Tsmoki-Minsk beat 50–57 (107 points) Prishtina in the qualifying round in 2017–18. This is the overall record for the Basketball Champions League qualifying rounds

=== Comeback ===
- Only two teams have lost the first leg of a playoffs or qualifying round match with ten or more points, but still managed to qualify for the next round:
  - Karşıyaka lost by 10 (90–80) against Skyliners Frankfurt in the playoffs qualifiers 2016–17, but won by 20 (72–52) in the second leg and 152–142 on aggregate
  - AEK lost by 10 (88–98) against Nymburk in the round of 16 2017–18, but won by 11 (82–93) in the second leg and 181–180 on aggregate
- In the qualifying rounds, Donar lost by 20 (84–64) against Prishtina in the first leg, but won by 25 (80–55) in the second leg and 144–139 in the aggregate.
- AEK came back from 25 points down to win 80-72 against Karsiyaka in December 2022, the biggest comeback for any team in BCL history.
- In the 2022-2023 play-ins, Limoges CSP beat Riesen Ludwigsburg after being down by 22 points, the biggest comeback ever by any team in a road game in BCL history.

=== Countries ===
- 7 meetings between teams from the same country have been played:
  - 2 meetings from the German league:
    - 2017–18 Oldenburg–Riesen Ludwigsburg, round of 16, 149–162 (63–88, 86–74)
    - 2017–18 Riesen Ludwigsburg–Bayreuth, quarterfinals, 170–163 (81–86, 89–77)
  - 2 meetings from the Turkish league:
    - 2016–17 Karşıyaka–Beşiktaş, round of 16, 165–153 (75–70, 90–83)
    - 2019–20 Türk Telekom–Beşiktaş, round of 16, 2–0 (89–78, 84–66)
  - 2 meetings from the Spanish league:
    - 2017–18 Murcia–Canarias, round of 16, 149–143 (66–71, 83–72)
    - 2019–20 Zaragoza–Canarias, quarterfinals, 87–81
  - 1 meeting from the Greek league:
    - 2018–19 PAOK–AEK, round of 16, 138–146 (75–84, 63–62)

=== Specific regular season records ===
==== 14 wins ====
No team won all the 14 matches of the regular season. However, two teams won 13 matches:

- Monaco in 2017–18
- Murcia in 2018–19

==== 14 losses ====
No team ended the regular season without wins. However, three teams ended with only one win and 13 losses:

- Bakken Bears in 2016–17
- Olimpija in 2018–19
- VEF Rīga 2019–20

==== 6 wins ====
Five teams have won all 6 matches of the regular season:

- Bamberg in 2020–21
- Málaga has achieved this feat twice, in 2024–25 and 2025–26
- Canarias in 2024–25
- Joventut Badalona in 2025–26
- Gran Canaria in 2025–26

==== 6 losses ====
Nine teams have ended the regular season with no wins and 6 losses:

- Keravnos in 2020–21
- Start Lublin in 2020–21
- Fortitudo Bologna in 2020–21
- Opava in 2023–24
- Igokea in 2023–24
- Szczecin in 2024–25
- Kolossos in 2024–25
- Bursaspor in 2025–26
- Oostende in 2025–26

==== Biggest disparity between group winner and runner-up ====
The biggest wins difference between the first- and second-placed teams in a Champions League regular season is four wins, achieved by Murcia, 13 wins (+135) in 2018–19 (2nd Bandırma 9 wins, +76).

==== Fewest wins achieved, yet won the group ====
- Le Mans Sarthe, 9 wins in 2016–17.
- Strasbourg, 9 wins in 2017–18.

==== Most wins achieved, yet knocked out ====
- Estudiantes, 8 wins in 2017–18.
- Reyer Venezia, 8 wins in 2017–18.
- SIG Strasbourg, 8 wins in 2018–19.

==== Most wins achieved in the group stage, not winning the group ====
- Riesen Ludwigsburg, 12 wins in 2017–18 (ranked second)
- Hapoel Jerusalem, 12 wins in 2018–19 (ranked second)

==== Fewest wins achieved, yet advanced ====
- Zielona Góra, 6 wins in 2017–18 (ranked fourth)

=== Qualifying from first qualifying round ===
Only four teams have negotiated all the rounds of qualification and reached the Champions League regular season:

- Oradea in 2016–17 (two rounds)
- Riesen Ludwigsburg in 2017–18 (three rounds)
  - Riesen Ludwigsburg went on to become the first team in the history of the competition to reach the playoffs and the Final Four from the first qualifying round.
- Fribourg Olympic in 2018–19 (three rounds)
- Falco Szombathely in 2019–20 (two rounds)

=== Consecutive wins ===
Monaco holds the record of 14 consecutive wins in the Champions League. Its run started in the 2016–17 third place game and ended in the 2017–18 round 14.

==== Consecutive home wins ====
Monaco holds the record with 17 consecutive home wins in the Champions League. Its run started in the 2016–17 regular season first round and ended in the 2017–18 quarterfinals second leg.

==== Consecutive away wins ====
Monaco holds the record with 7 consecutive away wins in the Champions League. Its run started in the 2016–17 quarterfinals first leg and ended in the 2017–18 regular season round 14.

=== Consecutive losses ===
- Radom holds the record of 13 consecutive losses between the 2016–17 regular season round 4 and the 2017–18 regular season round 2.
- Opava has the record in an only season, from the 2018–19 regular season round 2 to the round 13.

== Players ==
=== Games played ===
==== Players with most games played ====
As of 11 May 2026.

The table below does not include games played in the qualifying rounds of the competition.

Bold indicates players competed in the 2025-26 Basketball Champions League while indicates also player's current club.

	Player	Games played	Seasons	Clubs
1	(United States) **Tim Abromaitis**	131	8	**Tenerife**, Unicaja Malaga
2	(Uruguay) **Bruno Fitipaldo**	118	8	Avellino, San Pablo Burgos, **Tenerife**
3	(Czech Republic) **Vojtěch Hruban**	117	8	**Nymburk**, Cholet
4	(Canada) **Aaron Doornekamp**	116	8	**Tenerife**
5	(Georgia (country)) **Giorgi Shermadini**	111	7	**Tenerife**
6	(Czech Republic) **Martin Kříž**	110	7	**Nymburk**
7	(Brazil) **Marcelinho Huertas**	107	7	**Tenerife**
8	(Greece) Linos Chrysikopoulos	103	7	PAOK, AEK, Promitheas
9	(Spain) **Jonathan Barreiro**	102	7	Basket Zaragoza, **Unicaja Malaga**
10	(Spain) **Fran Guerra**	97	7	**Tenerife**

=== Scoring leaders ===
==== All-time top scorers ====
As of 11 May 2026.

The table below does not include points scored in the qualifying rounds of the competition.

Bold indicates players competed in the 2025-26 Basketball Champions League while indicates also player's current club.

	Player	Points	Games	Ratio	Seasons	Clubs
1	(Georgia (country)) **Giorgi Shermadini**	1440	111	12.97	7	**Tenerife**
2	(Brazil) **Marcelinho Huertas**	1358	107	12.69	7	**Tenerife**
3	(Czech Republic) **Vojtěch Hruban**	1279	117	10.93	8	**Nymburk**, Cholet
4	(United States) **Tim Abromaitis**	1033	131	7.88	8	**Tenerife**, Unicaja Malaga
5	(United States) Levi Randolph	1030	75	13.73	5	Avellino, Dinamo Sassari, SIG Strasbourg, Oostende, Hapoel Jerusalem
6	(Uruguay) **Bruno Fitipaldo**	946	118	8.01	8	Avellino, San Pablo Burgos, **Tenerife**
7	(United States) Joe Ragland	942	66	14.27	4	Avellino, Hapoel Holon, Peristeri
8	(Hungary) Zoltán Perl	938	56	16.75	6	Falco KC Szombathely
9	(Czech Republic) **Jaromir Bohacik**	935	96	9.73	7	**Nymburk**, SIG Strasbourg
10	(United States) **TaShawn Thomas**	925	73	12.67	6	Hapoel Holon, Hapoel Jerusalem, Derthona, **Le Mans Sarthe**

=== Game highs ===
	Player	Points	Club	Date	Rival
1	(United States) Jordan Walker	54	(Greece) Promitheas Patras	19 March 2025	(Germany) Würzburg Baskets
2	(United States) Keifer Sykes	43	(Italy) Avellino	22 January 2019	(Turkey) Bandırma
2	(United States) Saben Lee	43	(Turkey) Manisa Basket	9 October 2024	(Serbia) FMP
4	(United States) Jimmy Baron	42	(Lithuania) Neptūnas	6 December 2016	(Turkey) Uşak Sportif
4	(United States) Martin Zeno	42	(Romania) Oradea	18 January 2017	(Finland) Kataja
5	(Colombia) Braian Angola	41	(Turkey) Pinar Karşıyaka	3 January 2023	(Spain) UCAM Murcia

=== Rebounding leaders ===
==== All-time top rebounders ====
As of 11 May 2026.

The table below does not include rebounds collected in the qualifying rounds of the competition.

Bold indicates players competed in the 2025-26 Basketball Champions League while indicates also player's current club.

	Player	Rebounds	Games	Ratio	Seasons	Clubs
1	(United States) **Tim Abromaitis**	606	131	4.62	8	**Tenerife**, Unicaja Malaga
2	(Georgia (country)) **Giorgi Shermadini**	590	111	5.31	7	**Tenerife**
3	(Canada) **Aaron Doornekamp**	482	116	4.15	8	**Tenerife**
4	(France) **Wilfried Yeguete**	403	64	6.29	5	**Le Mans Sarthe**, CSP Limoges
4	(Czech Republic) **Vojtěch Hruban**	403	117	3.44	8	**Nymburk**, Cholet
6	(United States) **TaShawn Thomas**	402	73	5.50	6	Hapoel Holon, Hapoel Jerusalem, Derthona, **Le Mans Sarthe**
7	(Czech Republic) **Martin Kříž**	386	110	3.50	7	**Nymburk**
8	(Croatia) Miro Bilan	382	65	5.87	5	SIG Strasbourg, Dinamo Sassari, Prometey, Peristeri
9	(United States) **David Kravish**	374	79	4.73	7	BAXI Manresa, Brose Bamberg, Galatasaray, **Unicaja Malaga**
10	(Lithuania) Gytis Radzevičius	362	55	6.58	6	Rytas Vilnius

=== Game highs ===
	Player	Rebounds	Club	Date	Rival
1	(United States) Dave Dudzinski	22	(Belgium) Antwerp Giants	13 November 2019	(Poland) Anwil Włocławek
2	(United States) Keith Clanton	19	(Greece) PAOK	4 January 2017	(France) ASVEL Lyon-Villeurbanne
2	(United States) Tyler Stone	19	(Italy) Brindisi	4 December 2019	(Spain) Basket Zaragoza
2	(Canada) Dyshawn Pierre	19	(Italy) Dinamo Sassari	15 January 2020	(Poland) Polski Cukier Torun
2	(United States) Brady Skeens	19	(Hungary) Szolnoki Olajbányász	8 October 2025	(Slovakia) Patrioti Levice
2	(United States) Marcus Santos-Silva	19	(Czech Republic) Numburk	14 October 2025	(France) Élan Chalon
5	(Serbia) Vladimir Štimac	18	(Turkey) Beşiktaş	7 December 2016	(Belgium) Spirou Charleroi
5	(Trinidad and Tobago) DeVaughn Akoon-Purcell	18	(Denmark) Bakken Bears	3 January 2017	(Slovenia) Helios Suns
5	(Canada) Owen Klassen	18	(Germany) Riesen Ludwigsburg	16 January 2019	(Poland) Anwil Włocławek
5	(United States) David Kravish	18	(Turkey) Galatasaray	9 February 2022	(France) JDA Dijon
5	(Puerto Rico) Arnaldo Toro Barea	18	(Latvia) VEF Rīga	19 December 2023	(Turkey) Darüşşafaka
5	(France) Allan Dokossi	18	(France) JDA Dijon	20 March 2024	(Turkey) Galatasaray
5	(Puerto Rico) Arnaldo Toro Barea (2x)	18	(Latvia) VEF Rīga	10 December 2025	(Hungary) Szolnoki Olajbányász
5	(Australia) Jack White	18	(Turkey) Mersin	17 December 2025	(Belgium) Oostende

=== Assisting leaders ===
==== All-time top in assists ====
As of 11 May 2026.

The table below does not include assists given in the qualifying rounds of the competition.

Bold indicates players competed in the 2025-26 Basketball Champions League while indicates also player's current club.

	Player	Assists	Games	Ratio	Seasons	Clubs
1	(Brazil) **Marcelinho Huertas**	761	107	7.11	7	**Tenerife**
2	(United States) Joe Ragland	516	66	7.81	4	Avellino, Hapoel Holon, Peristeri
3	(United States) David Holston	426	72	5.91	6	JDA Dijon
4	(Uruguay) **Bruno Fitipaldo**	417	118	3.53	8	Avellino, San Pablo Burgos, **Tenerife**
5	(Serbia) Dušan Đorđević	362	78	4.64	7	Oostende
6	(United States) **Kendrick Perry**	335	74	4.52	5	Nizhny Novgorod, **Unicaja Malaga**
7	(United States) **Speedy Smith**	332	54	6.14	5	Limoges, **Rytas**, Hapoel Jerusalem
8	(Spain) Dani Perez	315	54	5.83	4	BAXI Manresa
9	(Israel) Tamir Blatt	306	53	5.77	4	Hapoel Holon, Hapoel Jerusalem
10	(United States) Dee Bost	292	60	4.86	5	AS Monaco, SIG Strasbourg, Galatasaray

=== Game highs ===
	Player	Assists	Club	Date	Rival
1	(United States) Joe Ragland	18	(Israel) Hapoel Holon	6 December 2022	(Poland) Legia Warsaw
2	(United States) Scottie Reynolds	17	(Croatia) Cibona Zagreb	3 January 2017	(Montenegro) Mornar Bar
2	(Brazil) Marcelinho Huertas	17	(Spain) Tenerife	22 January 2020	(Turkey) Gaziantep
4	(Italy) Marco Spissu	15	(Italy) Dinamo Sassari	4 November 2020	(Spain) Tenerife
4	(United States) Joe Ragland (2x)	15	(Greece) Peristeri	3 January 2024	(Lithuania) Rytas
4	(Brazil) Marcelinho Huertas (2x)	15	(Spain) Tenerife	23 January 2024	(Turkey) Karşıyaka
4	(Serbia) Boris Krnjajski	15	(Hungary) Szolnoki Olajbányász	16 December 2025	(Greece) AEK
5	(Finland) Teemu Rannikko	14	(Finland) Kataja	6 December 2016	(Israel) Maccabi Rishon LeZion
5	(United States) Jordan Theodore	14	(Turkey) Banvit	3 January 2017	(Greece) Aris
5	(Poland) Kamil Łączyński	14	(Poland) Anwil Włocławek	30 October 2018	(Germany) Riesen Ludwigsburg
5	(United States) Joe Ragland (3x)	14	(Israel) Hapoel Holon	9 February 2022	(Germany) Riesen Ludwigsburg
5	(Brazil) Marcelinho Huertas (3x)	14	(Spain) Tenerife	8 May 2022	(Spain) Bàsquet Manresa
5	(United States) Kenneth J. "Speedy" Smith Jr.	14	(Israel) Hapoel Jerusalem	30 November 2022	(Denmark) Bakken Bears
5	(United States) Joe Ragland (4x)	14	(Israel) Hapoel Holon	4 January 2023	(Bosnia and Herzegovina) Igokea
5	(Turkey) Doğuş Özdemiroğlu	14	(Turkey) Darüşşafaka	4 January 2023	(Portugal) S.L. Benfica
5	(United States) Joe Ragland (5x)	14	(Greece) Peristeri	10 March 2024	(Spain) Tenerife

=== Stealing leaders ===
==== All-time top in steals ====
As of 11 May 2026.

The table below does not include steals made in the qualifying rounds of the competition.

Bold indicates players competed in the 2025-26 Basketball Champions League while indicates also player's current club.

	Player	Steals	Games	Ratio	Seasons	Clubs
1	(Cuba) Howard Sant-Roos	125	67	1.86	5	Nymburk, AEK, UCAM Murcia
2	(United States) David Holston	118	72	1.63	6	JDA Dijon
3	(France) Paul Lacombe	106	69	1.53	5	SIG Strasbourg, AS Monaco, Nanterre 92
4	(Uruguay) **Bruno Fitipaldo**	104	118	0.88	8	Avellino, San Pablo Burgos, **Tenerife**
5	(France) **Wilfried Yeguete**	101	64	1.57	5	**Le Mans Sarthe**, CSP Limoges
6	(Czech Republic) **Vojtech Hruban**	99	117	0.84	8	**Nymburk**, Cholet
7	(Slovenia) Gregor Hrovat	96	58	1.65	5	Olympia Ljubljana, Medi Bayreuth, Cholet, JDA Dijon
8	(United States) **Kendrick Perry**	95	74	1.28	5	Nizhny Novgorod, **Unicaja Malaga**
9	(France) Jérémy Leloup	91	63	1.44	4	SIG Strasbourg, JDA Dijon
10	(United States) **Tim Abromaitis**	90	131	0.68	8	**Tenerife**, Unicaja Malaga

=== Game highs ===
	Player	Steals	Club	Date	Rival
1	(Canada) Daniel Mullings (**q**)	8	(Finland) Kataja	27 September 2016	(Sweden) Södertälje Kings
1	(France) Jérémy Leloup	8	(France) SIG Strasbourg	11 October 2017	(Slovenia) Olimpija Ljubljana
3	(United States) Shaquielle McKissic	7	(Turkey) Uşak Sportif	25 October 2016	(Greece) PAOK
3	(Serbia) Rade Zagorac	7	(Serbia) Mega Basket	11 January 2017	(France) SIG Strasbourg
3	(Netherlands) Charlon Kloof	7	(Spain) UCAM Murcia	6 November 2018	(Poland) Anwil Włocławek
3	(United States) LaMonte Ulmer	7	(France) JDA Dijon	3 December 2019	(Turkey) Beşiktaş
3	(United States) Antwaine Wiggins	7	(Greece) PAOK	10 December 2019	(Turkey) Beşiktaş
3	(United States) Mario Chalmers	7	(Greece) AEK	8 January 2020	(Belgium) Antwerp Giants
3	(United States) David Holston	7	(France) JDA Dijon	13 December 2023	(Greece) Promitheas
3	(Poland) Andrzej Mazurczak	7	(Poland) King Szczecin	20 December 2023	(Italy) Dinamo Sassari
3	(United States) Kendale McCullum	7	(Israel) Maccabi Ironi Ramat Gan	10 December 2024	(Italy) AEK
3	(Greece) Dimitris Flionis	7	(Greece) AEK	11 March 2025	(Germany) Würzburg

- (**q**) indicates that achievement took place in qualification rounds

=== Blocking leaders ===
==== All-time top in blocks ====
As of 11 May 2026.

The table below does not include blocks made in the qualifying rounds of the competition.

Bold indicates players competed in the 2025-26 Basketball Champions League while indicates also player's current club.

	Player	Blocks	Games	Ratio	Seasons	Clubs
1	(United States) **TaShawn Thomas**	85	73	1.16	6	Hapoel Holon, Hapoel Jerusalem, Derthona, **Le Mans Sarthe**
2	(United States) Michale Kyser	76	52	1.46	4	VEF Rīga, Hapoel Holon, Bilbao Basket
3	(United States) Zach Hankins	67	45	1.48	3	Nymburk, Hapoel Jerusalem
4	(Georgia (country)) **Giorgi Shermadini**	63	111	0.56	7	**Tenerife**
5	(United States) **David Kravish**	59	79	0.74	7	Manresa, Brose Bamberg, Galatasaray, **Unicaja Malaga**
6	(Poland) Damian Kulig	55	48	1.14	4	Bandırma, Twarde Pierniki Toruń, Stal Ostrów Wielkopolski
7	(Serbia) Dejan Kravić	54	51	1.05	4	Virtus Bologna, San Pablo Burgos, Unicaja Malaga
8	(Serbia) Uroš Luković	50	25	2.00	2	Partizan, KK Mornar Bar
9	(Finland) **Alexander Madsen**	47	58	0.81	6	AEK, VEF Riga, **Karditsa**
9	(Lithuania) **Gytis Masiulis**	47	79	0.59	6	Neptunas, **Rytas**
10	(United States) Julian Gamble	46	42	1.09	4	Telekom Baskets Bonn, Nanterre 92, Tenerife, San Pablo Burgos, Bnei Herzliya

=== Game highs ===
	Player	Blocks	Club	Date	Rival
1	(Germany) Johann Grünloh	8	(Germany) Vechta	4 December 2024	(Greece) Promitheas
2	(United States) Octavius Ellis	7	(Montenegro) Mornar Bar	2 November 2016	(Israel) Mega Basket
2	(Canada) Sean Denison	7	(Romania) CSM U Oradea	14 December 2016	(Israel) Maccabi Rishon LeZion
2	(Romania) Emanuel Cățe	7	(Spain) UCAM Murcia	13 March 2019	(Belgium) Antwerp Giants
2	(France) Jerry Boutsiele	7	(Turkey) Bahçeşehir	17 January 2023	(Belgium) Oostende
6	(United States) Diamon Simpson	6	(Czech Republic) Basketball Nymburk	29 November 2016	(Slovenia) Helios Suns
6	(Greece) Vassilis Kavvadas	6	(Greece) Aris	3 January 2017	(Turkey) Banvit
6	(Antigua and Barbuda) Norvel Pelle	6	(Italy) Pallacanestro Varese	18 January 2017	(Turkey) Uşak Sportif
6	(Senegal) Hamady N'Diaye	6	(Italy) Avellino	31 October 2017	(Poland) Zielona Góra
6	(Ukraine) Kyrylo Fesenko	6	(Italy) Avellino	13 December 2017	(Turkey) Beşiktaş
6	(Serbia) Uroš Luković	6	(Montenegro) Mornar Bar	14 January 2020	(Germany) Brose Bamberg
6	(United States) Michale Kyser	6	(Israel) Hapoel Holon	12 April 2022	(France) SIG Strasbourg
6	(Turkey) Furkan Haltalı	6	(Turkey) Karşıyaka	15 November 2023	(France) SIG Strasbourg

=== 3 Pointers leaders ===
==== All-time 3 pointers made ====
As of 11 May 2026.

The table below does not include 3 pointers made in the qualifying rounds of the competition.

Bold indicates players competed in the 2025-26 Basketball Champions League while indicates also player's current club.

	Player	3-Pointers	Games	Ratio	Seasons	Clubs
1	(Finland) Sasu Salin	207	74	2.79	5	Tenerife
2	(Canada) **Aaron Doornekamp**	191	116	1.64	8	**Tenerife**
3	(United States) David Holston	179	72	2.48	6	JDA Dijon
4	(Uruguay) **Bruno Fitipaldo**	178	118	1.50	8	Avellino, San Pablo Burgos, **Tenerife**
5	(Czech Republic) **Vojtěch Hruban**	174	117	1.48	8	**Nymburk**, Cholet
6	(Belgium) **Pierre-Antoine Gillet**	167	87	1.91	10	**Oostende**, Élan Chalon, Tenerife
7	(United States) **Tyler Kalinoski**	165	94	1.75	6	Antwerp Giants, Bandırma, **Unicaja Malaga**
8	(United States) **Tim Abromaitis**	164	131	1.25	8	**Tenerife**, Unicaja Malaga
9	(United States) Thad McFadden	155	70	2.21	6	PAOK, Tenerife, San Pablo Burgos, UCAM Murcia
10	(Czech Republic) **Jaromir Bohacik**	147	96	1.53	7	**Nymburk**, SIG Strasbourg

=== Game highs ===
	Player	3-Pointers	Club	Date	Rival
1	(United States) Jimmy Baron	10	(Lithuania) Neptūnas	6 December 2016	(Turkey) Uşak Sportif
2	(United States) Rion Brown	9	(Finland) Kataja	6 December 2016	(Israel) Maccabi Rishon LeZion
2	(Dominican Republic) James Feldeine	9	(Israel) Hapoel Jerusalem	7 November 2018	(Czech Republic) Basketball Nymburk
2	(United States) Justin Dentmon	9	(France) Élan Béarnais	17 December 2019	(Germany) Rasta Vechta
2	(Cape Verde) Ivan Almeida (**q**)	9	(Portugal) Benfica	25 September 2022	(Germany) Brose Bamberg
2	(United States) Jhonathan Dunn	9	(Germany) Riesen Ludwigsburg	3 January 2023	(France) Limoges CSP
2	(United States) Jordan Walker	9	(Greece) Promitheas Patras	19 March 2025	(Germany) Würzburg Baskets
5	(United States) Michael Dixon	8	(Greece) AEK	7 December 2016	(Hungary) Szolnoki Olajbányász
5	(Latvia) Rihards Lomažs	8	(Latvia) Ventspils	24 January 2018	(Turkey) Gaziantep
5	(United States) Khalif Wyatt	8	(Israel) Hapoel Holon	17 October 2018	(Italy) Reyer Venezia
5	(United States) Keith Hornsby	8	(Poland) Twarde Pierniki Toruń	22 October 2019	(France) SIG Strasbourg
5	(Germany) Robin Benzing	8	(Spain) Basket Zaragoza	21 January 2020	(France) JDA Dijon
5	(United States) Brandon Jefferson	8	(France) SIG Strasbourg	13 November 2020	(Lithuania) Rytas Vilnius
5	(Finland) Sasu Salin	8	(Spain) Tenerife	15 December 2020	(Turkey) Galatasaray
5	(United States) Kasey Shepherd	8	(Russia) Nizhny Novgorod	22 March 2021	(Turkey) Türk Telekom
5	(Finland) Sasu Salin (2x)	8	(Spain) Tenerife	6 October 2021	(Ukraine) Prometey
5	(United States) Melo Trimble	8	(Turkey) Galatasaray	6 October 2021	(Czech Republic) Basketball Nymburk
5	(Finland) Sasu Salin (3x)	8	(Spain) Tenerife	6 April 2022	(Turkey) Tofaş
5	(Finland) Sasu Salin (4x)	8	(Spain) Tenerife	17 October 2022	(France) Cholet
5	(United States) Jarell Eddie	8	(Greece) Peristeri	6 November 2024	(Turkey) Manisa Basket
5	(Germany) David Krämer	8	(Spain) Tenerife	13 November 2024	(France) Saint-Quentin

- (**q**) indicates that achievement took place in qualification rounds

=== Triple Doubles ===
	Player	Club	Triple double	Date	Rival
1	(United States) Chris Kramer	(Germany) Oldenburg	16 points, 10 rebounds, 13 assists	10 January 2017	(Turkey) Uşak Sportif
2	(Lithuania) Arnas Butkevičius	(Lithuania) Neptūnas	19 points, 13 rebounds, 10 assists	15 November 2017	(Greece) PAOK
3	(Iceland) Elvar Már Friðriksson	(Greece) PAOK	19 points, 11 rebounds, 10 assists	18 October 2023	(Turkey) Galatasaray

=== Other Statistics ===
==== Game highs in efficiency ====
	Player	Efficiency	Club	Date	Rival
1	(United States) Jordan Walker	58	(Greece) Promitheas Patras	19 March 2025	(Germany) Würzburg Baskets
2	(United States) Steven Gray	47	(Greece) Peristeri	27 October 2020	(Lithuania) Rytas
3	(Croatia) Miro Bilan	46	(Ukraine) Prometey	10 February 2022	(Belgium) Oostende
4	(United States) Henry Sims	44	(Italy) Treviso	19 October 2021	(Greece) AEK
5	(United States) Keifer Sykes	43	(Italy) Avellino	22 January 2019	(Turkey) Bandırma
5	(United States) Joe Ragland	43	(Israel) Hapoel Holon	11 October 2022	(Belgium) Oostende
