= 2022 Basketball Champions League Final Four =

- Season: 2021–22 season

Tournament details
- Arena: Bilbao Arena; Bilbao, Spain
- Dates: 6–8 May 2022

Final positions
- Champions: (Spain) Lenovo Tenerife (2nd title)
- Runners-up: (Spain) Baxi Manresa
- Third place: (Germany) MHP Riesen Ludwigsburg
- Fourth place: (Israel) Hapoel Holon

Awards and statistics
- MVP: Marcelo Huertas (Tenerife)
- Attendance: 21,657

The 2022 Basketball Champions League (BCL) Final Four was the 6th Basketball Champions League tournament and the 4th in the format of Final Four. It was the concluding phase of the 2021–22 Basketball Champions League season.

It was the first time the tournament was held in Bilbao, and the first time a neutral venue was used for the Final Four.

CB Canarias (known as Lenovo Tenerife for sponsorship reasons) won its second-ever BCL championship. Canarias' point guard Marcelo Huertas was named the Final Four MVP.

== Venue ==
The Bilbao Arena hosted the final tournament for the first time.

Bilbao	2022 Basketball Champions League Final Four (Europe)
Bilbao Arena	2022 Basketball Champions League Final Four (Europe)
Capacity: 10,014	2022 Basketball Champions League Final Four (Europe)

== Teams ==
Team	Previous final tournament appearances (Note: Both Final Four and Final Eight tournaments.)
(Spain) Lenovo Tenerife	4 (2017, 2019, 2020, 2021)
(Germany) MHP Riesen Ludwigsburg	1 (2018)
(Israel) Hapoel Holon	1 (2021)
(Spain) Baxi Manresa	Debut

== Bracket ==
Semifinals
6 May
(Spain) Baxi Manresa	63
(Germany) MHP Riesen Ludwigsburg	55
6 May
(Israel) Hapoel Holon	71
(Spain) Lenovo Tenerife	78

Final
8 May
(Spain) Baxi Manresa	87
(Spain) Lenovo Tenerife	98
Third place game
8 May
(Germany) MHP Riesen Ludwigsburg	88
(Israel) Hapoel Holon	68

== Semifinals ==
6 May 2022	Hapoel Holon (Israel)	71–78	(Spain) Lenovo Tenerife	Bilbao
18:00	Scoring by quarter: 13–20, 20–22, 18–17, 20–19
	Pts: Ragland 22; Rebs: Menco 6 Asts: Ragland 5 Eff: Ragland 25	Boxscore	Pts: Huertas 17; Rebs: Guerra 9 Asts: Huertas 9 Eff: Huertas 23	Arena: Bilbao Arena; Attendance: 6,000; Referees: Yohan Rosso (FRA), Saverio Lanzarini (ITA), Mārtiņš Kozlovskis (LVA)

6 May 2022	Baxi Manresa (Spain)	63–55	(Germany) MHP Riesen Ludwigsburg	Bilbao
21:00	Scoring by quarter: 20–17, 15–18, 20–14, 8–6
	Pts: Sima 15; Rebs: Moneke 13; Asts: Pérez 7 Eff: Moneke 18	Boxscore	Pts: Simon 18; Rebs: Happ, Radebaugh 9 Asts: Happ, Simon 2 Eff: Simon 17	Arena: Bilbao Arena; Attendance: 6,000; Referees: Manuel Mazzoni (ITA), Martin Horozov (BUL), Wojciech Liszka (POL)

== Third place game ==
8 May 2022	Hapoel Holon (Israel)	68–88	(Germany) MHP Riesen Ludwigsburg	Bilbao
17:00	Scoring by quarter: 27–19, 15–10, 27–19, 19–20
	Pts: Simon 27; Rebs: Radebaugh 7 Asts: Simon 6 Eff: Radebaugh 24	Boxscore	Pts: McGee 14; Rebs: Menco 8 Asts: Ragland 5 Eff: McGee, Ragland 12	Arena: Bilbao Arena; Attendance: 1,500; Referees: Saverio Lanzarini (ITA), Michał Proc (POL), Geert Jacobs (BEL)

== Final ==
8 May 2022	Baxi Manresa (Spain)	87–98	(Spain) Lenovo Tenerife	Bilbao
20:00	Scoring by quarter: 25–27, 25–22, 17–33, 20–16
	Pts: Moneke 24; Rebs: Moneke 8 Asts: Bako, Thomasson 3 Eff: Moneke 27	Boxscore	Pts: Salin 18; Rebs: Doornekamp 7 Asts: Huertas 14; Eff: Huertas 22	Arena: Bilbao Arena; Attendance: 8,157; Referees: Manuel Mazzoni (ITA), Yohan Rosso (FRA), Wojciech Liszka (POL)
