= Chima Moneke =

Nigerian-Australian basketball player (born 1995)

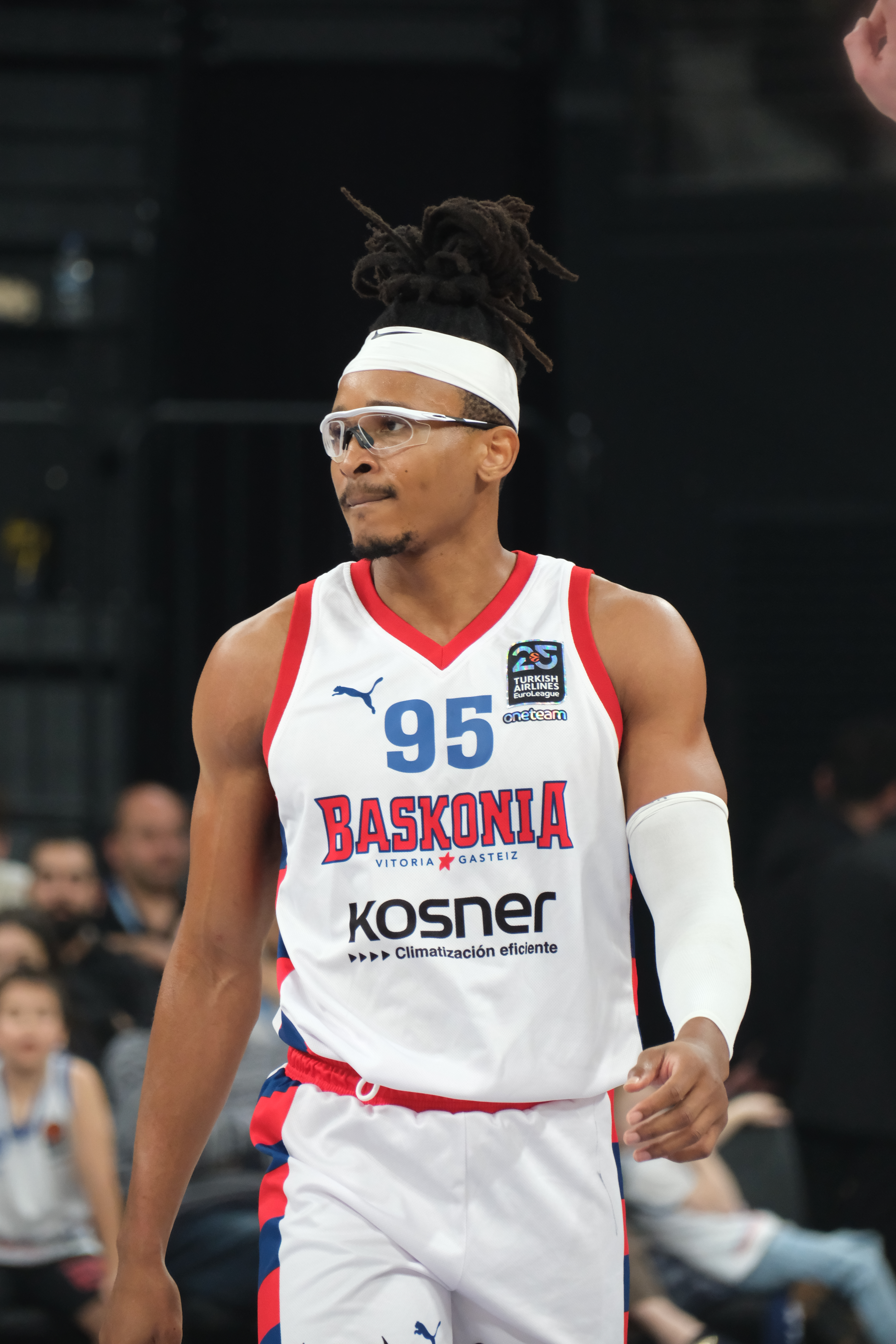
- Moneke with Baskonia in 2025

No. 95 – Crvena zvezda
- Position: Power forward
- League: KLS; ABA League; EuroLeague

Personal information
- Born: 24 December 1995 (age 30) Abuja, Nigeria
- Listed height: 1.99 m (6 ft 6 in)
- Listed weight: 101 kg (223 lb)

Career information
- High school: UC Senior Secondary College Lake Ginninderra (Canberra, Australia)
- College: Northeast CC (2013–2015); UC Davis (2016–2018)
- NBA draft: 2018: undrafted
- Playing career: 2018–present

Career history
- 2018: Rouen Métropole
- 2018–2019: Denain Voltaire
- 2019–2020: Béliers de Kemper
- 2020–2021: Orléans Loiret
- 2021–2022: Manresa
- 2022–2023: Sacramento Kings
- 2022–2023: →Stockton Kings
- 2023: AS Monaco
- 2023–2025: Baskonia
- 2025–present: Crvena zvezda

Career highlights
- FIBA Champions League MVP (2022); All-FIBA Champions League First Team (2022); LNB Pro A champion (2023); French Cup winner (2023); All-Liga ACB First Team (2022); All-Liga ACB Second Team (2024); First-team All-Big West (2017)
- Stats at NBA.com
- Stats at Basketball Reference

Nwachukwu Iheukwumere Chima Moneke (born 24 December 1995) is a Nigerian-Australian professional basketball player for Crvena zvezda of the Basketball League of Serbia (KLS), the ABA League and the EuroLeague. At 6'6" tall, he plays at the power forward position. He also represents the Nigerian national team in international competition.

== Early life ==
Moneke was born in Abuja, Nigeria, before moving to Canberra, Australia to begin schooling. His parents, Sydney and Eucharia Moneke, were diplomats of the Nigerian embassy. He attended Farrer Primary School and Lake Ginninderra College before traveling again throughout the world.

== College career ==
In 2013, Moneke enrolled at Northeast Community College in Norfolk, Nebraska, where he stayed for two seasons (2013–15). In his sophomore season he averaged 17 ppg and 12.1 rpg which led the team to a 25–7 record.

He then transferred to the University of California at Davis. After his redshirt season, he led the Aggies to an NCAA tournament berth for the first time in school history in the 2016–17 season. He was named Big West Conference tournament MVP. In the tournament they defeated North Carolina Central in the play-in game in which Moneke had 18 points and 12 rebounds. They would go on to lose to the #1 overall seed Kansas, where Moneke finished with 20 points and 9 rebounds. He averaged 14.6 points, 9.5 rebounds and 1.4 blocks per game with 14 double-doubles.

In the 2017–18 season, he averaged 18.4 points, 9.6 rebounds and 1.1 blocks per performance in 21 games with the Aggies.

== Professional career ==
=== Rouen Métropole (2018) ===
After not being selected in the 2018 NBA draft, Moneke signed his first professional contract with Rouen Métropole of the French LNB Pro B. After the season, he signed with the South East Melbourne Phoenix of the Australian NBL before it was blown off due to problems with his passport.

=== Denain Voltaire (2018–2019) ===
In November 2018, he would leave Rouen Métropole to sign for Denain Voltaire, also from the French LNB Pro B. He averaged 14.3 points, 6.6 rebounds and 1.7 assists in 27 games.

=== Béliers de Kemper (2019–2020) ===
In the 2019–20 season, he signed for the Béliers de Kemper of the French LNB Pro B, in which he averaged 15.8 points, 6.75 rebounds and 1.7 assists per game. The season was cancelled early due to the COVID-19 pandemic in France.

=== Orléans Loiret (2020–2021) ===
In the 2020–21 season, he signed for the Orléans Loiret of the LNB Pro A, with averages of 12.5 points, 6 rebounds, 1.8 assists and almost a block per performance in the 21 games played.

=== Manresa (2021–2022) ===
On 13 July 2021, Moneke signed a one-year deal with the Bàsquet Manresa of the Spanish Liga Endesa and the Basketball Champions League (BCL). He helped Manresa to a surprising season in the BCL as they reached the final where they lost to Tenerife in the final. Moneke was named the MVP of the 2021–22 season after averaging 13.1 points per game.

In the Spanish ACB, Moneke was named to the ALL-ACB 1st team after leading Manresa to the playoffs. He averaged 14.8 points per game on 53% shooting. He was second in the entire league in rebounding with 8.4 per game. He led the entire league in total steals (56), steals per game (1.6) and defensive rebounds.

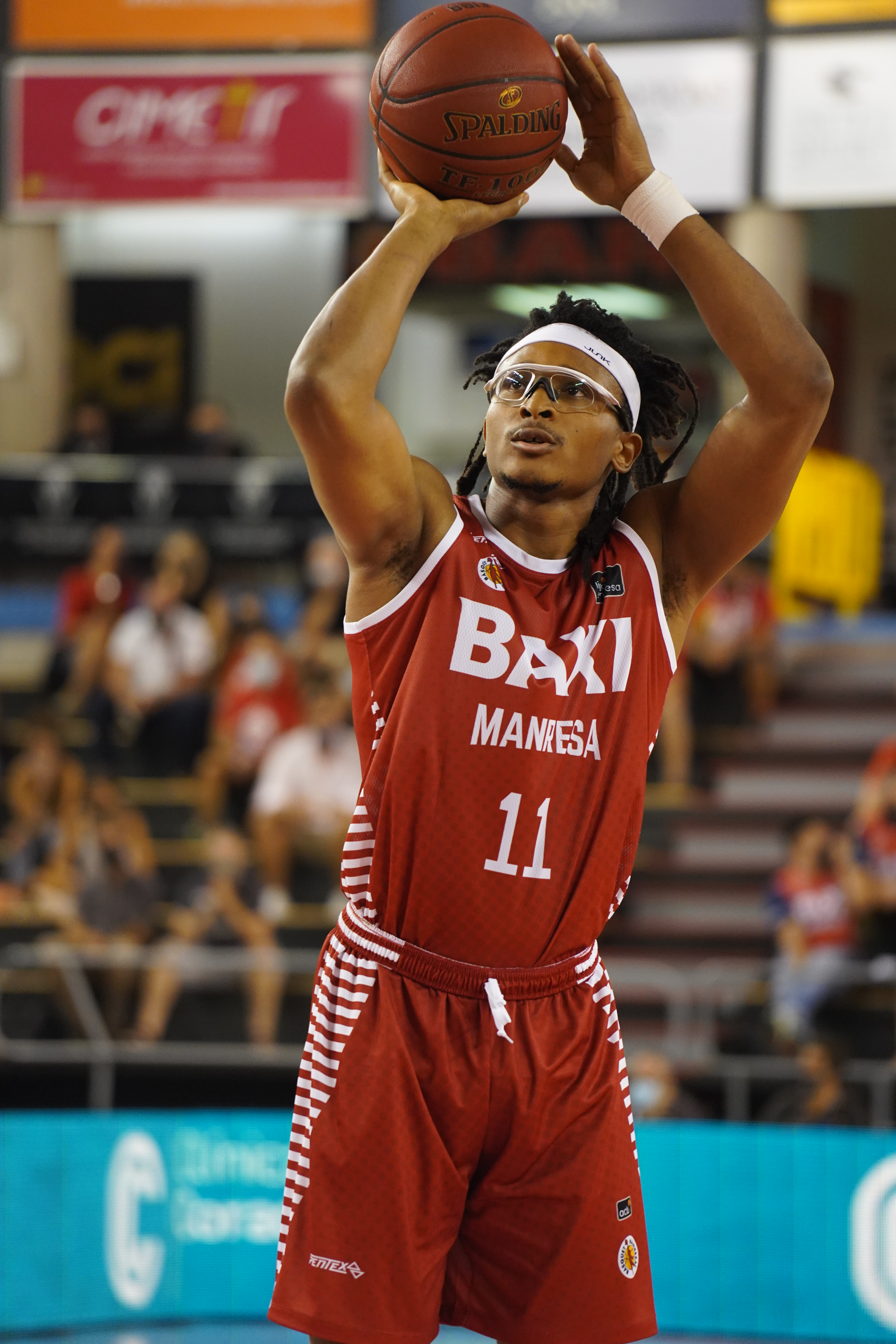
Moneke with Manresa in 2021

=== Sacramento Kings (2022–2023) ===
On 18 July 2022, Moneke signed with the Sacramento Kings, uniting with Nigeria's national team coach Mike Brown. On 6 January 2023, Moneke was waived by the Kings.

=== AS Monaco (2023) ===
On January 16, 2023, Moneke signed with AS Monaco of the LNB Élite and the EuroLeague.

=== Baskonia (2023–2025) ===
On July 19, 2023, Moneke signed with Baskonia of the Spanish Liga ACB and the EuroLeague. On November 17, 2023, Moneke recorded a double-double with 19 points and 13 rebounds in an 88-81 win against LDLC ASVEL.

=== Crvena zvezda (2025–present) ===
On June 24, 2025, Moneke signed with Crvena zvezda of the Basketball League of Serbia (KLS), ABA League and the EuroLeague.

== National team career ==
He debuted with the Nigeria men's national basketball team in 2020, playing three qualifying matches for the Afrobasket. In 2021, he was summoned for the pre-selection to compete in the 2020 Summer Olympics.

== Career statistics ==
Legend
GP	Games played	GS	Games started	MPG	Minutes per game
FG%	Field-goal percentage	3P%	3-point field-goal percentage	FT%	Free-throw percentage
RPG	Rebounds per game	APG	Assists per game	SPG	Steals per game
BPG	Blocks per game	PPG	Points per game	PIR	Performance index rating
**Bold**	Career high

=== NBA ===
Year	Team	GP	GS	MPG	FG%	3P%	FT%	RPG	APG	SPG	BPG	PPG
2022–23	Sacramento	2	0	4.0	.500	—	.000	1.0	.5	—	—	1.0
Career		2	0	4.0	.500	—	.000	1.0	.5	—	—	1.0

=== EuroLeague ===
Year	Team	GP	GS	MPG	FG%	3P%	FT%	RPG	APG	SPG	BPG	PPG	PIR
2022–23	Monaco	16	1	12.6	.476	.000	**.885**	3.1	.5	.3	.2	3.9	4.6
2023–24	Baskonia	34	7	24.7	.531	**.353**	.764	**6.6**	1.4	**1.1**	**.5**	13.6	18.3
2024–25	Baskonia	33	29	**28.2**	.495	.295	.813	6.1	**2.3**	.9	.3	**14.0**	**18.6**
2025–26	Crvena zvezda	**35**	**35**	26.9	**.557**	.343	.774	6.5	2.0	1.0	.4	13.9	18.5
Career		118	72	24.7	.525	.320	.788	5.9	1.7	.9	.4	12.5	16.6

=== Basketball Champions League ===
Year	Team	GP	GS	MPG	FG%	3P%	FT%	RPG	APG	SPG	BPG	PPG
2021–22	Manresa	15	8	22.2	.588	.350	.713	6.3	1.1	1.2	.5	13.9
Career		15	8	22.2	.588	.350	.713	6.3	1.1	1.2	.5	13.9

=== Domestic leagues ===
Year	Team	League	GP	MPG	FG%	3P%	FT%	RPG	APG	SPG	BPG	PPG
2018–19	(France) Rouen Métropole	Pro B	3	16.0	.286	1.000	.667	3.3	.7	1.7	.3	4.3
2018–19	(France) Denain Voltaire	Pro B	27	27.2	.556	.417	.803	6.6	1.7	1.2	.5	14.3
2019–20	(France) UJAP Quimper	Pro B	24	27.6	.563	.383	.726	6.7	1.7	1.2	.8	15.8
2020–21	(France) Orléans Loiret	LNB Élite	31	23.4	.628	.333	.781	6.4	1.5	1.0	.4	13.7
2021–22	(Spain) Manresa	ACB	36	24.1	.521	.290	.735	8.2	1.5	1.6	.5	14.5
2022–23	(United States) Stockton Kings	G League	2	28.2	.375	.000	.500	7.0	1.5	.5	—	7.5
2022–23	(France) Monaco	LNB Élite	11	18.1	.720	.500	.838	4.0	1.1	1.1	.4	9.7
2023–24	(Spain) Baskonia	ACB	28	24.6	.542	.415	.777	6.6	1.6	.9	.4	15.2
2024–25	(Spain) Baskonia	ACB	31	25.1	.481	.365	.791	5.0	2.4	.7	.4	12.7

=== College ===
Year	Team	GP	GS	MPG	FG%	3P%	FT%	RPG	APG	SPG	BPG	PPG
2015–16	UC Davis	Redshirt										
2016–17	UC Davis	**36**	**33**	27.3	**.527**	—	.645	9.5	.8	.9	**1.4**	14.6
2017–18	UC Davis	21	21	**30.0**	.515	**.375**	**.714**	**9.6**	**1.0**	**1.0**	1.1	**18.4**
Career		57	54	28.3	.522	.375	.674	9.5	.9	.9	1.3	16.0

== Personal life ==
Moneke attended Canberra High School and Lake Ginninderra College in Canberra, Australia where he played high school basketball with Danté Exum.
