= 2021–22 Basketball Champions League =

6th season of the Basketball Champions League

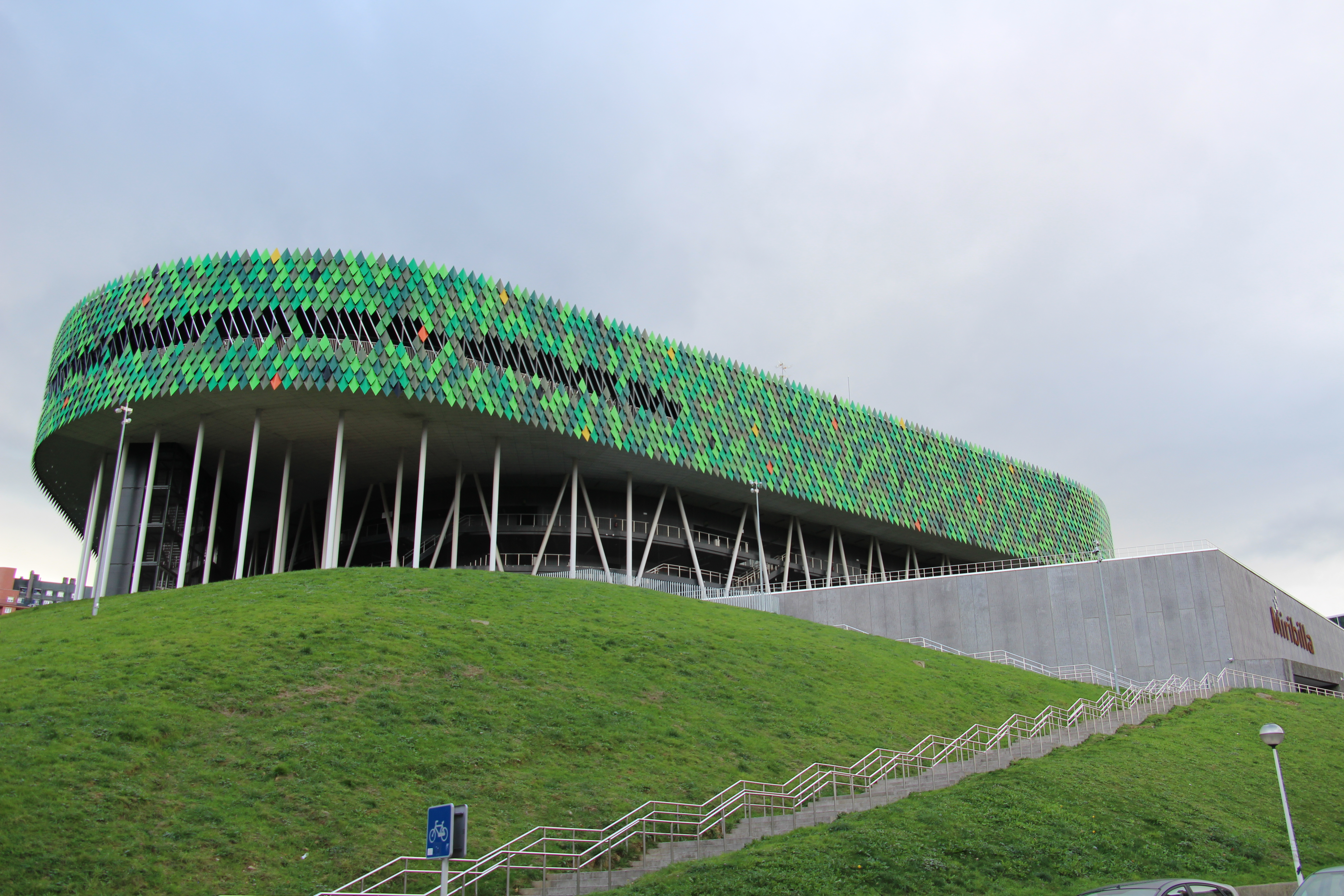
- The Bilbao Arena hosted the Final Four
- Season: 2021–22
- Dates: Qualifying: 13–17 September 2021; Competition proper: 5 October 2021 – 8 May 2022
- Teams: Competition proper: 32; Total: 52 (from 30 countries)

Regular season
- Season MVP: Chima Moneke (Manresa)

Final Four
- Champions: (Spain) Lenovo Tenerife (2nd title)
- Runners-up: (Spain) Baxi Manresa
- Third place: (Germany) MHP Riesen Ludwigsburg
- Fourth place: (Israel) Hapoel Holon
- Final Four MVP: Marcelo Huertas (Tenerife)

Awards
- Best Coach: (Spain) Pedro Martínez
- Best Young Player: (Italy) Giordano Bortolani

Statistical leaders
Points	(United States) Levi Randolph	18.1
Rebounds	(United States) Dedric Lawson	8.0
Assists	(United States) Joe Ragland	7.8
Efficiency	(United States) DeVaughn Akoon-Purcell	16.6

The 2021–22 Basketball Champions League was the 6th season of the Basketball Champions League (BCL), the premier European professional basketball competition for clubs launched by FIBA. The season began on 5 October 2021 and ended on 15 May 2022, featuring 16 domestic champion teams.

The defending champions, San Pablo Burgos, were eliminated in the play-ins. The winners of the Champions League will qualify for the 2023 FIBA Intercontinental Cup. The Bilbao Arena in Bilbao hosted the Final Four, which marked the first time the arena of a non-participating team is chosen as a host.

Lenovo Tenerife won its second-ever Champions League title (its last being in 2017) after defeating Baxi Manresa in the final.

== Team allocation ==
A total of 52 teams from 30 countries participated in the 2021–22 Basketball Champions League.

=== Teams ===
League positions after eventual playoffs of the previous season shown in parentheses (TH: Champions League title holders, WC: Wild card).

The Basketball Champions League rankings are taken into consideration.

Qualified teams for 2021–22 Basketball Champions League (by entry round)
Regular season
(Turkey) Pınar Karşıyaka (3rd)	(Spain) Baxi Manresa (10th)	(Germany) MHP Riesen Ludwigsburg (3rd)	(Bosnia and Herzegovina) Igokea (3rd/4th)
(Turkey) Beşiktaş Icrypex (4th)	(Spain) Unicaja (11th)	(Germany) EWE Baskets Oldenburg (5th)	(Czech Republic) ERA Nymburk (1st)
(Turkey) Tofaş (5th)	(Greece) Lavrio Megabolt (2nd)	(Israel) Hapoel Holon (3rd)	(Hungary) Falco Szombathely (1st)
(Turkey) Darüşşafaka (7th)^{WC}	(Greece) AEK (3rd)	(Israel) Hapoel Jerusalem (6th)	(Latvia) VEF Rīga (1st)
(Turkey) Galatasaray Nef (14th)^{WC}	(Greece) PAOK (5th)^{WC}	(Italy) Happy Casa Brindisi (3rd)	(Lithuania) Rytas (2nd)
(Spain) Lenovo Tenerife (3rd)	(France) JDA Dijon (2nd)	(Italy) Dinamo Sassari (5th)	(Poland) Stal Ostrów Wielkopolski (1st)
(Spain) Hereda San Pablo Burgos^{TH} (6th)	(France) SIG Strasbourg (3rd)	(Belgium) Filou Oostende (1st)	(Russia) Nizhny Novgorod (5th)
Qualifying rounds
(Austria) Kapfenberg Bulls (2nd)	(Czech Republic) Opava (2nd)	(United Kingdom) London Lions (2nd)	(Netherlands) ZZ Leiden (1st)
(Belgium) Belfius Mons-Hainaut (2nd)	(Denmark) Bakken Bears (1st)	(Greece) Peristeri (6th)	(Portugal) Sporting CP (1st)
(Belarus) Tsmoki-Minsk (1st)	(Estonia) Kalev/Cramo (1st)	(Israel) Hapoel Eilat (4th)	(Romania) U-BT Cluj-Napoca (1st)
(Bulgaria) Levski Lukoil (1st)	(Finland) Salon Vilpas (1st)	(Italy) NutriBullet Treviso (6th)	(Russia) Parma (7th)
(Croatia) Split (2nd)	(France) Le Mans (7th)	(Lithuania) Juventus (4th)	(Switzerland) Fribourg Olympic (1st)
(Cyprus) AEK Larnaca (1st)	(Germany) Brose Bamberg (8th)	(Montenegro) Mornar (2nd)	(Ukraine) Prometey (1st)

== Referees ==
A total of 55 officials set to work on the 2021–22 season in Basketball Champions League:

Referees of the 2021–22 season
(Belarus) Andrei Sharapa; (Belgium) Geert Jacobs; (Bosnia and Herzegovina) Ademir Zurapović; (Bulgaria) Martin Horozov; (Croatia) Josip Jurčević; (Croatia) Martin Vulić; (Cyprus) Ilias Kounelles; (Czech Republic) Ivor Matějek; (Estonia) Mihkel Männiste; (France) Thomas Bissuel; (France) Alexandre Deman; (France) Nicolas Maestre; (France) Yohan Rosso; (Germany) Carsten Straube; (Greece) Georgios Poursanidis; (Hungary) Péter Praksch; (Israel) Erez Gurion; (Italy) Beniamino Attard; (Italy) Lorenzo Baldini	(Italy) Saverio Lanzarini; (Italy) Manuel Mazzoni; (Latvia) Andris Aunkrogers; (Latvia) Mārtiņš Kozlovskis; (Latvia) Oskars Lucis; (Latvia) Gatis Saliņš; (Lithuania) Gvidas Gedvilas; (Lithuania) Tomas Jasevičius; (Lithuania) Gintaras Mačiulis; (Montenegro) Zdravko Rutešić; (Montenegro) Radomir Vojinović; (North Macedonia) Igor Mitrovski; (Poland) Wojciech Liszka; (Poland) Michał Proc; (Poland) Dariusz Zapolski; (Portugal) Paulo Marques; (Romania) Marius Ciulin; (Russia) Alexey Davydov	(Russia) Semen Ovinov; (Serbia) Aleksandar Glišić; (Serbia) Vladimir Jevtović; (Serbia) Siniša Prpa; (Slovakia) Marek Kúkelčík; (Slovakia) Zdenko Tomašovič; (Slovenia) Boris Krejić; (Slovenia) Blaž Zupančič; (Spain) Fernando Calatrava; (Spain) Luis Castillo; (Spain) Antonio Conde; (Sweden) Apostolos Kalpakas; (Turkey) Kerem Baki; (Turkey) Mehmet Karabilecen; (Turkey) Özlem Yalman; (Turkey) Yener Yılmaz; (Turkey) Zafer Yılmaz; (Ukraine) Sergiy Zashchuk

== Schedule ==
The schedule of the competition will be as follows.

Schedule for 2021–22 Basketball Champions League
Phase	Round		Draw date	First leg	Second leg	Third leg
Qualifying rounds	First qualifying round		7 July 2021	13–14 September 2021		
Qualifying rounds	Second qualifying round		7 July 2021	15–16 September 2021		
Qualifying rounds	Third qualifying round		7 July 2021	17–18 September 2021		
Regular season	Round 1		7 July 2021	4–6 October 2021		
Regular season	Round 2	Groups A, B, E, F	7 July 2021	11–13 October 2021		
Regular season	Round 2	Groups C, D, G, H	7 July 2021	18–20 October 2021		
Regular season	Round 3	Groups A, B, E, F	7 July 2021	25–27 October 2021		
Regular season	Round 3	Groups C, D, G, H	7 July 2021	1–3 November 2021		
Regular season	Round 4	Groups A, B, E, F	7 July 2021	8–10 November 2021		
Regular season	Round 4	Groups C, D, G, H	7 July 2021	15–17 November 2021		
Regular season	Round 5	Groups A, B, E, F	7 July 2021	6–8 December 2021		
Regular season	Round 5	Groups C, D, G, H	7 July 2021	13–15 December 2021		
Regular season	Round 6		7 July 2021	21–22 December 2021		
Play-ins			7 July 2021	4–5 January 2022	11–12 January 2022	18–19 January 2022
Round of 16	Round 1		7 July 2021	25–26 January 2022		
Round of 16	Round 2		7 July 2021	1–2 February 2022		
Round of 16	Round 3		7 July 2021	7–9 February 2022		
Round of 16	Round 4		7 July 2021	7–9 March 2022		
Round of 16	Round 5		7 July 2021	14–16 March 2022		
Round of 16	Round 6		7 July 2021	22–23 March 2022		
Play-offs	Quarter-finals		25 March 2022	5–6 April 2022	12–13 April 2022	19–20 April 2022
Final Four	Semi-finals		25 March 2022	6 May 2022		
Final Four	Final		25 March 2022	8 May 2022		

== Qualifying rounds ==
=== Draw ===
The 24 teams will be divided into six pots based firstly on the competition's club ranking and, for clubs that have not yet participated in the competition, on the country ranking. For the quarterfinals round of qualifications, teams from Pot 6 will be drawn against teams from Pot 3, and teams from Pot 4 will face teams from Pot 5. Clubs from Pot 1 and 2 will be seeded, and will enter directly in the semifinals stage of qualifications and will face the winners from the quarterfinals round. The winners of the semifinals stage will face each other in the finals of qualifications. The four winners of the finals will then qualify for the regular season and join the 28 directly qualified teams in the main draw. The rest of the teams will be demoted, if they apply, to the FIBA Europe Cup.

Pot 1
Team	Pts
(Germany) Brose Bamberg	94
(Greece) Peristeri	37
(France) Le Mans	25
(Denmark) Bakken Bears	17

Pot 4
Team	Pts
(Romania) U-BT Cluj-Napoca	1
(United Kingdom) London Lions	1
(Austria) Kapfenberg Bulls	1
(Russia) Parma	87.00^{†}

Pot 2
Team	Pts
(Switzerland) Fribourg Olympic	14
(Montenegro) Mornar	13
(Belarus) Tsmoki-Minsk	13
(Czech Republic) Opava	9

Pot 5
Team	Pts
(Italy) NutriBullet Treviso	69.58^{†}
(Israel) Hapoel Eilat	67.00^{†}
(Lithuania) Juventus	41.00^{†}
(Finland) Salon Vilpas	6.00^{†}

Pot 3
Team	Pts
(Bulgaria) Levski Lukoil	2
(Portugal) Sporting CP	2
(Belgium) Belfius Mons-Hainaut	2
(Cyprus) AEK Larnaca	1

Pot 6
Team	Pts
(Netherlands) ZZ Leiden	5.00^{†}
(Ukraine) Prometey	3.00^{†}
(Croatia) Split	0^{†}
(Estonia) Kalev/Cramo	0^{†}

Notes

^† Indicates teams with no club points, therefor using the country points as a tiebreaker.

==== Qualification Group A (Athens, Greece) ====
Quarterfinals
13 September
(Romania) U-BT Cluj-Napoca	106
(Finland) Salon Vilpas	97
13 September
(Cyprus) AEK Larnaca	50
(Croatia) Split	65

Semifinals
15 September
(Greece) Peristeri	74
(Romania) U-BT Cluj-Napoca	84
15 September
(Switzerland) Fribourg Olympic	76
(Croatia) Split	67

Final
17 September
(Romania) U-BT Cluj-Napoca	77
(Switzerland) Fribourg Olympic	64

==== Qualification Group B (Treviso, Italy) ====
Quarterfinals
13 September
(United Kingdom) London Lions	62
(Italy) NutriBullet Treviso	89
13 September
(Belgium) Belfius Mons-Hainaut	74
(Netherlands) ZZ Leiden	76

Semifinals
15 September
(Denmark) Bakken Bears	90
(Italy) NutriBullet Treviso	92
15 September
(Belarus) Tsmoki-Minsk	69
(Netherlands) ZZ Leiden	67

Final
17 September
(Italy) NutriBullet Treviso	95
(Belarus) Tsmoki-Minsk	78

==== Qualification Group C (Tallinn, Estonia) ====
Quarterfinals
13 September
(Austria) Kapfenberg Bulls	68
(Lithuania) Juventus	90
13 September
(Portugal) Sporting CP	69
(Estonia) Kalev/Cramo	86

Semifinals
15 September
(Germany) Brose Bamberg	79
(Lithuania) Juventus	83
15 September
(Montenegro) Mornar	89
(Estonia) Kalev/Cramo	104

Final
17 September
(Lithuania) Juventus	81
(Estonia) Kalev/Cramo	86

==== Qualification Group D (Sofia, Bulgaria) ====
Quarterfinals
14 September
(Russia) Parma	79
(Israel) Hapoel Eilat	76
14 September
(Bulgaria) Levski Lukoil	56
(Ukraine) Prometey	96

Semifinals
16 September
(France) Le Mans	69
(Russia) Parma	82
16 September
(Czech Republic) Opava	78
(Ukraine) Prometey	100

Final
18 September
(Russia) Parma	65
(Ukraine) Prometey	67

== Regular season ==
=== Draw ===
The 28 teams that entered in the regular season directly were divided into four pots based firstly on the club ranking and, for clubs that have not yet participated in the competition, on the country ranking. The country protection rule will apply for the stage of the draw. Clubs cannot be drawn in groups with other clubs from the same country.

Pot 1
Team	Pts
(Spain) Lenovo Tenerife	133
(Greece) AEK	117
(Spain) Hereda San Pablo Burgos	109
(Russia) Nizhny Novgorod	101
(Israel) Hapoel Jerusalem	93
(Czech Republic) ERA Nymburk	83
(France) SIG Strasbourg	80
(Israel) Hapoel Holon	78

Pot 2
Team	Pts
(France) JDA Dijon	74
(Belgium) Filou Oostende	58
(Italy) Dinamo Sassari	57
(Turkey) Beşiktaş Icrypex	52
(Turkey) Pınar Karşıyaka	51
(Italy) Happy Casa Brindisi	46
(Greece) PAOK	43
(Hungary) Falco Szombathely	31

Pot 3
Team	Pts
(Latvia) VEF Rīga	29
(Turkey) Tofaş	28
(Spain) Baxi Manresa	19
(Germany) MHP Riesen Ludwigsburg	11
(Lithuania) Rytas	11
(Turkey) Darüşşafaka	8
(Turkey) Galatasaray Nef	8
(Spain) Unicaja	105.50^{†}

Pot 4
Team	Pts
(Bosnia and Herzegovina) Igokea	28
(Germany) EWE Baskets Oldenburg	75.67^{†}
(Greece) Lavrio Megabolt	67.75^{†}
(Poland) Stal Ostrów Wielkopolski	20.17^{†}
(Romania) U-BT Cluj-Napoca (Winner QF-T1)
(Italy) NutriBullet Treviso (Winner QF-T2)
(Estonia) Kalev/Cramo (Winner QF-T3)
(Ukraine) Prometey (Winner QF-T4)

Notes

^† Indicates teams with no club points, therefor using the country points as a tiebreaker.

=== Group A ===
Pos	Team	Pld	W	L	PF	PA	PD	Pts	Qualification	LUD	TFE	PRO	DIN
1	(Germany) MHP Riesen Ludwigsburg	6	4	2	494	450	+44	10	Advance to round of 16	—	80–69	60–71	94–81
2	(Spain) Lenovo Tenerife	6	4	2	476	450	+26	10	Advance to play-ins	83–99	—	80–78	87–60
3	(Ukraine) Prometey	6	3	3	459	434	+25	9	Advance to play-ins	64–86	70–73	—	89–56
4	(Italy) Dinamo Sassari	6	1	5	421	516	−95	7		82–75	63–84	79–87	—

Source: Groups Standings
Legend: Blue = home team win; Red = away team win.

=== Group B ===
Pos	Team	Pld	W	L	PF	PA	PD	Pts	Qualification	BAX	JER	KAR	STA
1	(Spain) Baxi Manresa	6	5	1	487	445	+42	11	Advance to round of 16	—	85–90	88–69	81–76
2	(Israel) Hapoel Jerusalem	6	3	3	475	461	+14	9	Advance to play-ins	68–73	—	84–86	83–76
3	(Turkey) Pınar Karşıyaka	6	3	3	453	475	−22	9	Advance to play-ins	67–72	65–85	—	80–77
4	(Poland) Stal Ostrów Wielkopolski	6	1	5	449	483	−34	7		75–88	76–65	69–86	—

Source: Groups Standings
Legend: Blue = home team win; Red = away team win.

=== Group C ===
Pos	Team	Pld	W	L	PF	PA	PD	Pts	Qualification	UNI	JDA	LAV	NIZ
1	(Spain) Unicaja	6	4	2	467	403	+64	10	Advance to round of 16	—	83–54	86–70	93–69
2	(France) JDA Dijon	6	3	3	442	433	+9	9	Advance to play-ins	78–68	—	73–49	89–75
3	(Greece) Lavrio Megabolt	6	3	3	411	440	−29	9	Advance to play-ins	70–58	65–63	—	95–86
4	(Russia) Nizhny Novgorod	6	2	4	459	503	−44	8		62–79	93–85	74–62	—

Source: Groups Standings
Legend: Blue = home team win; Red = away team win.

=== Group D ===
Pos	Team	Pld	W	L	PF	PA	PD	Pts	Qualification	FAL	TVS	VEF	AEK
1	(Hungary) Falco Szombathely	6	5	1	461	442	+19	11	Advance to round of 16	—	81–80	68–59	83–78
2	(Italy) NutriBullet Treviso	6	4	2	483	446	+37	10	Advance to play-ins	68–60	—	91–85	81–69
3	(Latvia) VEF Rīga	6	2	4	463	474	−11	8	Advance to play-ins	74–80	74–71	—	92–76
4	(Greece) AEK	6	1	5	471	516	−45	7		83–89	77–92	88–79	—

Source: Groups Standings
Legend: Blue = home team win; Red = away team win.

=== Group E ===
Pos	Team	Pld	W	L	PF	PA	PD	Pts	Qualification	GAL	IGO	POK	NYM
1	(Turkey) Galatasaray Nef	6	5	1	525	486	+39	11	Advance to round of 16	—	82–74	87–75	101–85
2	(Bosnia and Herzegovina) Igokea	6	3	3	460	454	+6	9	Advance to play-ins	85–89	—	68–64	76–69
3	(Greece) PAOK	6	2	4	442	459	−17	8	Advance to play-ins	81–74	64–75	—	83–84
4	(Czech Republic) ERA Nymburk	6	2	4	481	509	−28	8		86–92	86–82	71–75	—

Source: Groups Standings
Legend: Blue = home team win; Red = away team win.

=== Group F ===
Pos	Team	Pld	W	L	PF	PA	PD	Pts	Qualification	TOF	SIG	OOS	KAL
1	(Turkey) Tofaş	6	4	2	483	463	+20	10	Advance to round of 16	—	85–75	92–83	77–81
2	(France) SIG Strasbourg	6	3	3	491	489	+2	9	Advance to play-ins	74–76	—	91–92	75–73
3	(Belgium) Filou Oostende	6	3	3	516	500	+16	9	Advance to play-ins	78–83	77–83	—	99–66
4	(Estonia) Kalev/Cramo	6	2	4	463	501	−38	8		72–70	86–93	85–87	—

Source: Groups Standings
Legend: Blue = home team win; Red = away team win.

=== Group G ===
Pos	Team	Pld	W	L	PF	PA	PD	Pts	Qualification	CLU	HOL	DAR	BRI
1	(Romania) U-BT Cluj-Napoca	6	5	1	523	505	+18	11	Advance to round of 16	—	106–101	66–60	104–94
2	(Israel) Hapoel Holon	6	4	2	494	458	+36	10	Advance to play-ins	78–68	—	64–57	84–80
3	(Turkey) Darüşşafaka	6	2	4	459	470	−11	8	Advance to play-ins	101–103	86–79	—	82–76
4	(Italy) Happy Casa Brindisi	6	1	5	464	507	−43	7		71–76	61–88	82–73	—

Source: Groups Standings
Legend: Blue = home team win; Red = away team win.

=== Group H ===
Pos	Team	Pld	W	L	PF	PA	PD	Pts	Qualification	RYT	BUR	BJK	OLD
1	(Lithuania) Rytas	6	4	2	475	442	+33	10	Advance to round of 16	—	87–69	82–69	71–69
2	(Spain) Hereda San Pablo Burgos	6	4	2	487	472	+15	10	Advance to play-ins	77–84	—	82–74	92–80
3	(Turkey) Beşiktaş Icrypex	6	3	3	471	478	−7	9	Advance to play-ins	82–79	75–82	—	88–72
4	(Germany) EWE Baskets Oldenburg	6	1	5	450	491	−41	7		76–72	72–85	81–83	—

Source: Groups Standings
Legend: Blue = home team win; Red = away team win.

== Play-ins ==
The Play-ins took place from January 4 to 19. The teams classified in second and third place in their respective groups of Basketball Champions League, will go on to the Play-ins. Winners will advance to the round of 16. The first legs were played on 4–5 January, the second legs on 11–12 January. Third legs were played on 18–19 January.

Team 1	Series	Team 2	Game 1	Game 2	Game 3
Lenovo Tenerife (Spain)	2–1	(Turkey) Pınar Karşıyaka	76–69	80–88	74–71
Hapoel Jerusalem (Israel)	1–2	(Ukraine) Prometey	95–70	79–82	75–85
JDA Dijon (France)	2–0	(Latvia) VEF Rīga	84–77	83–79	—
NutriBullet Treviso (Italy)	2–0	(Greece) Lavrio Megabolt	87–72	90–78	—
Igokea (Bosnia and Herzegovina)	1–2	(Belgium) Filou Oostende	87–72	64–85	77–83
SIG Strasbourg (France)	2–0	(Greece) PAOK	105–78	80–79	—
Hapoel Holon (Israel)	2–1	(Turkey) Beşiktaş Icrypex	72–73	72–70	74–68
Hereda San Pablo Burgos (Spain)	1–2	(Turkey) Darüşşafaka	83–78	66–85	68–80

== Round of 16 ==
The Round of 16 took place from January 25 until March 23, 2022. The groups were formed by the winners of each Regular Season Group and by eight Play-Ins winners. The 16 teams were divided in 4 groups, 4 teams each. The first two of each groups advanced to the quarter-finals.

=== Group I ===
Pos	Team	Pld	W	L	PF	PA	PD	Pts	Qualification	HOL	LUD	JDA	GAL
1	(Israel) Hapoel Holon	6	4	2	465	443	+22	10	Advance to quarter-finals	—	69–51	90–83	98–89
2	(Germany) MHP Riesen Ludwigsburg	6	4	2	438	414	+24	10	Advance to quarter-finals	68–71	—	95–73	76–71
3	(France) JDA Dijon	6	3	3	461	476	−15	9		78–66	72–84	—	80–69
4	(Turkey) Galatasaray Nef	6	1	5	433	464	−31	7		74–71	58–64	72–75	—

Source: Round of 16 Standings
Legend: Blue = home team win; Red = away team win.

=== Group J ===
Pos	Team	Pld	W	L	PF	PA	PD	Pts	Qualification	BAX	TOF	DAR	TVS
1	(Spain) Baxi Manresa	6	4	2	537	483	+54	10	Advance to quarter-finals	—	85–70	89–74	108–88
2	(Turkey) Tofaş	6	4	2	483	440	+43	10	Advance to quarter-finals	74–68	—	91–81	82–80
3	(Turkey) Darüşşafaka	6	4	2	492	495	−3	10		89–84	75–74	—	88–76
4	(Italy) NutriBullet Treviso	6	0	6	464	558	−94	6		88–103	51–92	81–85	—

Source: Round of 16 Standings
Legend: Blue = home team win; Red = away team win.

=== Group K ===
Pos	Team	Pld	W	L	PF	PA	PD	Pts	Qualification	CLU	UNI	OOS	PRO
1	(Romania) U-BT Cluj-Napoca	4	3	1	320	308	+12	7	Advance to quarter-finals	—	70–86	86–75	—
2	(Spain) Unicaja	4	2	2	302	294	+8	6	Advance to quarter-finals	73–79	—	75–59	—
3	(Belgium) Filou Oostende	4	1	3	294	314	−20	5		74–85	86–68	—	87–91
4	(Ukraine) Prometey (Note: Prometey withdrew from the Basketball Champions League due to the 2022 Russian invasion of Ukraine. Thus, according to article D.5.1 of the FIBA Official Basketball Rules, all its results in the relevant phases were annulled.)	0	0	0	0	0	0	0	Withdraw	81–92 (Note: The rescheduled game was played in Nymburk (Czech Republic) instead of Kyiv by the decision of FIBA Europe.)	70–69	—	—

Source: Round of 16 Standings
Legend: Blue = home team win; Red = away team win.

=== Group L ===
Pos	Team	Pld	W	L	PF	PA	PD	Pts	Qualification	TFE	SIG	RYT	FAL
1	(Spain) Lenovo Tenerife	6	6	0	494	407	+87	12	Advance to quarter-finals	—	71–66	89–75	87–62
2	(France) SIG Strasbourg	6	3	3	463	449	+14	9	Advance to quarter-finals	67–85	—	71–73	98–86
3	(Lithuania) Rytas	6	2	4	455	493	−38	8		64–83	71–76	—	91–88
4	(Hungary) Falco Szombathely	6	1	5	458	521	−63	7		73–79	63–85	86–81	—

Source: Round of 16 Standings
Legend: Blue = home team win; Red = away team win.

== Playoffs ==
The playoffs began on April 5, 2022, and ended with the 2022 Basketball Champions League Final Four.

Quarterfinals
(Romania) U-BT Cluj-Napoca	76	75	73
(Germany) MHP Riesen Ludwigsburg	73	92	79
(Spain) Baxi Manresa	86	91	—
(Spain) Unicaja	63	89	—
(Israel) Hapoel Holon	93	81	—
(France) SIG Strasbourg	75	80	—
(Spain) Lenovo Tenerife	78	74	—
(Turkey) Tofaş	77	73	—

Semifinals
6 May
(Germany) MHP Riesen Ludwigsburg	55
(Spain) Baxi Manresa	63
6 May
(Israel) Hapoel Holon	71
(Spain) Lenovo Tenerife	78

Final
8 May
(Spain) Baxi Manresa	87
(Spain) Lenovo Tenerife	98
Third place
8 May
(Germany) MHP Riesen Ludwigsburg	88
(Israel) Hapoel Holon	68

== Final Four ==
=== Semifinals ===
The semifinals were played on 6 May 2022.

Team 1	Score	Team 2
Hapoel Holon (Israel)	71–78	(Spain) Lenovo Tenerife
Baxi Manresa (Spain)	63–55	(Germany) MHP Riesen Ludwigsburg

=== Third place game ===
The third place game was played on 8 May 2022.

Team 1	Score	Team 2
Hapoel Holon (Israel)	68–88	(Germany) MHP Riesen Ludwigsburg

=== Final ===
The final was played on 8 May 2022.

Team 1	Score	Team 2
Baxi Manresa (Spain)	87–98	(Spain) Lenovo Tenerife

== Individual awards ==
=== Season awards ===
The annual season awards were announced on 6 May.

Award	Player	Club
Most Valuable Player	(Nigeria) Chima Moneke	(Spain) Baxi Manresa
Final Four MVP	(Brazil) Marcelo Huertas	(Spain) Lenovo Tenerife
Best Young Player	(Italy) Giordano Bortolani	(Italy) NutriBullet Treviso
Best Coach	(Spain) Pedro Martínez	(Spain) Baxi Manresa

=== Star Lineup ===
First Team		Second Team	
Player	Team	Player	Team
(United States) Joe Ragland	(Israel) Hapoel U-NET Holon	(Brazil) Marcelinho Huertas	(Spain) Lenovo Tenerife
(United States) Jonah Radebaugh	(Germany) MHP RIESEN Ludwigsburg	(United States) Joe Thomasson	(Spain) Baxi Manresa
(Nigeria) Chima Moneke	(Spain) Baxi Manresa	(United States) DeVaughn Akoon-Purcell	(Turkey) Galatasaray Nef
(United States) Chris Johnson	(Israel) Hapoel U-NET Holon	(United States) Elijah Stewart	(Romania) U-BT Cluj-Napoca
(Georgia (country)) Giorgi Shermadini	(Spain) Lenovo Tenerife	(Croatia) Ivan Buva	(Lithuania) Rytas Vilnius

=== All Defensive Team ===
Player	Team	Ref.
(Spain) Alberto Díaz	(Spain) Unicaja	
(United States) Justin Simon	(Germany) Riesen Ludwigsburg	
(United States) Chris Johnson	(Israel) Hapoel U-NET Holon	
(United States) Kaiser Gates	(Israel) Hapoel Jerusalem	
(Nigeria) Chima Moneke	(Spain) Baxi Manresa	

=== MVP of the Month ===
Month	Player	Club	Ref.
2021
October	(United States) Jonah Radebaugh	(Germany) Riesen Ludwigsburg	
November	(Croatia) Ivan Buva	(Lithuania) Rytas Vilnius	
December	(United States) Brandon Brown	(Romania) U-BT Cluj-Napoca	
2022
January	(Turkey) Doğuş Özdemiroğlu	(Turkey) Darüşşafaka	
February	(United States) David Holston	(France) JDA Dijon	
March	(United States) (Liberia) Joe Ragland	(Israel) Hapoel Holon	
April	(Nigeria) Chima Moneke	(Spain) Baxi Manresa	

== Attendances to arenas ==
=== Average attendances ===
Pos	Team	Total	High	Low	Average
	Final Four in (Spanish Basketball Federation) Bilbao	22,460	7,495	3,514	5,615
1	(Spanish Basketball Federation) Hereda San Pablo Burgos	28,537	7,415	4,412	5,707
2	(Romanian Basketball Federation) U-BT Cluj-Napoca	32,205	10,000	0	4,601
3	(Spanish Basketball Federation) Unicaja	26,988	6,137	2,749	4,498
4	(Israeli Basketball Association) Hapoel Bank Yahav Jerusalem	19,672	6,046	0	3,934
5	(French Federation of Basketball) SIG Strasbourg	29,927	4,527	2,000	3,741
6	(Lithuanian Basketball Federation) Rytas	19,317	4,836	2,167	3,220
7	(German Basketball Federation) EWE Baskets Oldenburg	8,993	3,157	2,836	2,998
8	(Polish Basketball Federation) Arged BM Stal Ostrów Wielkopolski	8,843	2,978	2,924	2,948
9	(Spanish Basketball Federation) Baxi Manresa	20,373	4,785	0	2,910
10	(French Federation of Basketball) JDA Dijon	17,001	4,000	0	2,429
11	(Hungarian Basketball Federation) Falco Szombathely	12,570	2,500	1,500	2,095
12	(Spanish Basketball Federation) Lenovo Tenerife	18,791	3,744	652	2,088
13	(Turkish Basketball Federation) Galatasaray Nef	12,502	3,273	1,200	2,084
14	(Turkish Basketball Federation) Pınar Karşıyaka	7,500	2,500	1,000	1,875
15	(German Basketball Federation) MHP Riesen Ludwigsburg	10,431	3,242	500	1,490
16	(Italian Basketball Federation) NutriBullet Treviso	10,168	1,709	1,037	1,453
17	(Hellenic Basketball Federation) AEK	4,300	1,900	1,150	1,433
18	(Hellenic Basketball Federation) PAOK mateco	5,700	2,500	500	1,425
19	(Basketball Federation of Ukraine) Prometey	8,353	1,953	800	1,392
20	(Czech Basketball Federation) ERA Nymburk	4,133	1,790	973	1,378
21	(Italian Basketball Federation) Happy Casa Brindisi	3,900	1,500	1,000	1,300
22	(Turkish Basketball Federation) Darüşşafaka	7,188	1,630	0	1,027
23	(Israeli Basketball Association) Hapoel U-NET Holon	7,500	4,000	0	833
24	(Basketball Federation of Bosnia and Herzegovina) Igokea m:tel	3,400	1,000	400	680
25	(Italian Basketball Federation) Banco di Sardegna Sassari	1,928	669	617	643
26	(Estonian Basketball Association) Kalev/Cramo	1,850	834	408	617
27	(Basketball Belgium) Filou Oostende	3,543	1,001	2	506
28	(Russian Basketball Federation) Nizhny Novgorod	1,488	681	326	496
29	(Turkish Basketball Federation) Tofaş	3,453	1,959	0	493
30	(Latvian Basketball Association) VEF Rīga	1,530	530	0	383
31	(Turkish Basketball Federation) Beşiktaş Icrypex	1,453	568	0	363
32	(Hellenic Basketball Federation) Lavrio Megabolt	1,200	500	0	300
	League total	367,197	10,000	0	2,098

Source: FIBA

==== Qualification rounds ====
Pos	Team	Total	High	Low	Average
	Qualification Round A in (Hellenic Basketball Federation) Peristeri	557	420	20	111
	Qualification Round B in (Italian Basketball Federation) Treviso	3,474	1,671	0	695
	Qualification Round C in (Estonian Basketball Association) Tallinn	2,781	1,172	130	556
	Qualification Round D in (Bulgarian Basketball Federation) Sofia	0	0	0	0
	League total	6,812	1,671	0	341

Source: FIBA

== See also ==
- 2021–22 EuroLeague
- 2021–22 EuroCup Basketball
- 2021–22 FIBA Europe Cup
