= Jonah Radebaugh =

American-born Montenegrin basketball player

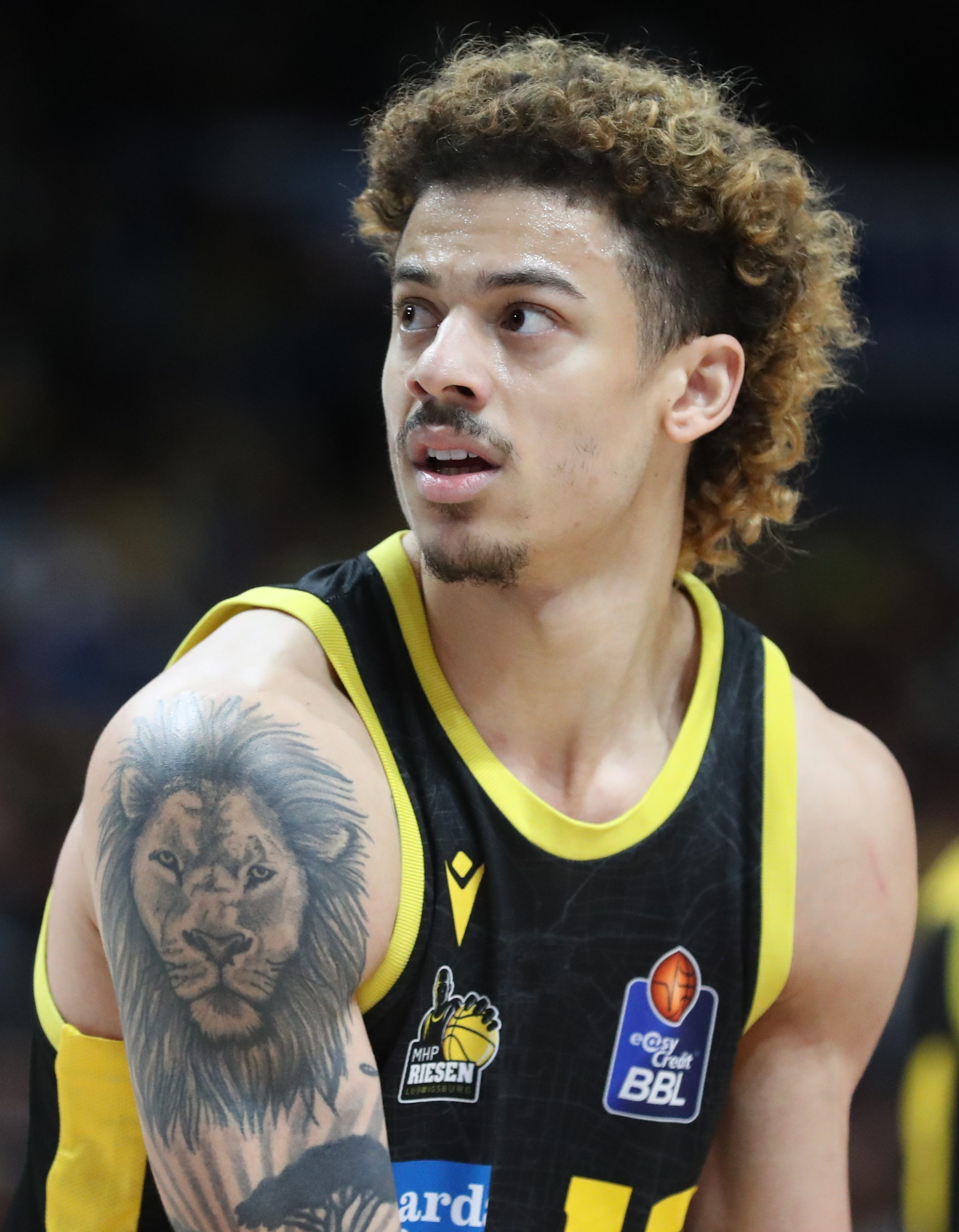
- Radebaugh wih Riesen Ludwigsburg in 2022

No. 12 – UCAM Murcia
- Position: Shooting guard
- League: Liga ACB

Personal information
- Born: June 17, 1997 (age 29)
- Listed height: 6 ft 3 in (1.91 m)
- Listed weight: 185 lb (84 kg)

Career information
- High school: Northglenn (Northglenn, Colorado)
- College: Northern Colorado (2016–2020)
- NBA draft: 2020: undrafted
- Playing career: 2020–present

Career history
- 2020: Köping Stars
- 2020–2022: Riesen Ludwigsburg
- 2022–2023: Valencia
- 2023–2024: Galatasaray
- 2024–present: Murcia

Career highlights
- All-Champions League First Team (2022); First-team All-Big Sky (2020); 3× Big Sky Defensive Player of the Year (2017, 2019, 2020)

Jonah Kameron Radebaugh (Montenegrin language: Џона Радебау; Džona Radebau; born June 17, 1997) is an American-born naturalized Montenegrin professional basketball player for UCAM Murcia of the Spanish Liga ACB. He played college basketball for Northern Colorado.

== Early life ==
Radebaugh began playing basketball at the age of five. He attended Northglenn High School in Northglenn, Colorado. As a senior, Radebaugh averaged 18 points per game and was named East Metro Athletic Conference (EMAC) Player of the Year. Northglenn lost to Grand Junction High School 65–57 in the second round of the Class 5A playoffs despite 26 points from Radebaugh. He decided to attend the University of Northern Colorado over an offer of guaranteed playing time at Division III Nebraska Wesleyan University.

== College career ==
Radebaugh walked on to the Northern Colorado Bears men's basketball team and redshirted his true freshman season. He averaged 7.6 points, 5.5 rebounds and 1.1 steals per game as a redshirt freshman. Radebaugh earned Big Sky Defensive Player of the Year honors and was placed on scholarship. As a sophomore, he averaged 7.9 points, 6.0 rebounds, and 1.0 steal per game. On February 7, 2019, Radebaugh scored a career-high 28 points shooting 5-of-6 from three-point range, and grabbed eight rebounds in an 80–62 win over Portland State. He averaged 9.5 points, 6.1 rebounds and 2.4 assists per game as a junior, earning Big Sky Defensive Player of the Year honors. Radebaugh scored a season-high 26 points and added six assists, five rebounds and four steals on December 17, 2019, in an 86–64 win over Denver. As a senior, Radebaugh averaged 16.5 points, 6.5 assists, 6.3 rebounds and 1.5 steals per game, leading Northern Colorado to a 22–9 record. He was named Big Sky Defensive Player of the Year for a record third season and garnered First Team All-Big Sky as well as NABC All-District 6 team honors.

== Professional career ==
=== Köping Stars ===
On September 15, 2020, Radebaugh signed his first professional contract with Köping Stars of the Swedish Basketball League.

=== Riesen Ludwigsburg ===
On December 15, Radebaugh chose to take advantage of a clause that made it possible to break the contract with Stars if a team from abroad wanted him. He signed a try-out contract with Ludwigsburg, second in the German Bundesliga season 2019/2020. On December 29, Radebaugh played his first game with the team, and recorded 6 points in 10 minutes in a win against Hamburg. On January 2, 2021, Radebaugh got a permanent deal with ”the Giants” until the end of the season.

=== Valencia Basket ===
On July 18, 2022, Valencia Basket announce the signing of Radebaugh, after executing the exit clause valid for Euroleague teams.

=== Galatasaray Ekmas ===
On July 3, 2023, he signed with Galatasaray Ekmas of the Turkish Basketbol Süper Ligi (BSL).

On 23 February 2024, Radebaugh and Galatasaray announced that they had parted ways by mutual agreement.

=== UCAM Murcia ===
On February 23, 2024, he signed with UCAM Murcia of the Spanish Liga ACB. On March 12, 2025, he signed a contract extension with the team until the end of the 2025-2026 season.

== National team career ==
Radebaugh is a member of the senior Montenegrin national team.

== Career statistics ==
Legend
GP	Games played	GS	Games started	MPG	Minutes per game
FG%	Field goal percentage	3P%	3-point field goal percentage	FT%	Free throw percentage
RPG	Rebounds per game	APG	Assists per game	SPG	Steals per game
BPG	Blocks per game	PPG	Points per game	**Bold**	Career high

=== College ===
Year	Team	GP	GS	MPG	FG%	3P%	FT%	RPG	APG	SPG	BPG	PPG
2016–17	Northern Colorado	29	28	33.8	.458	.396	.600	5.5	1.9	1.1	.1	7.6
2017–18	Northern Colorado	**38**	**36**	35.5	.469	.438	.672	6.0	1.3	1.0	**.3**	7.9
2018–19	Northern Colorado	32	32	37.0	.388	.318	.726	6.1	2.4	1.0	.2	9.5
2019–20	Northern Colorado	31	31	**37.7**	**.495**	**.443**	**.789**	**6.3**	**6.5**	**1.5**	.2	**16.5**
Career		130	127	36.0	.458	.395	.719	6.0	3.0	1.1	.2	10.3

== Personal life ==
Radebaugh has two older brothers: Jarred and Jordan, and a younger sister Hannah. Jonah began wearing his hair in a mullet in high school.
