= Justin Simon =

American basketball player (born 1996)

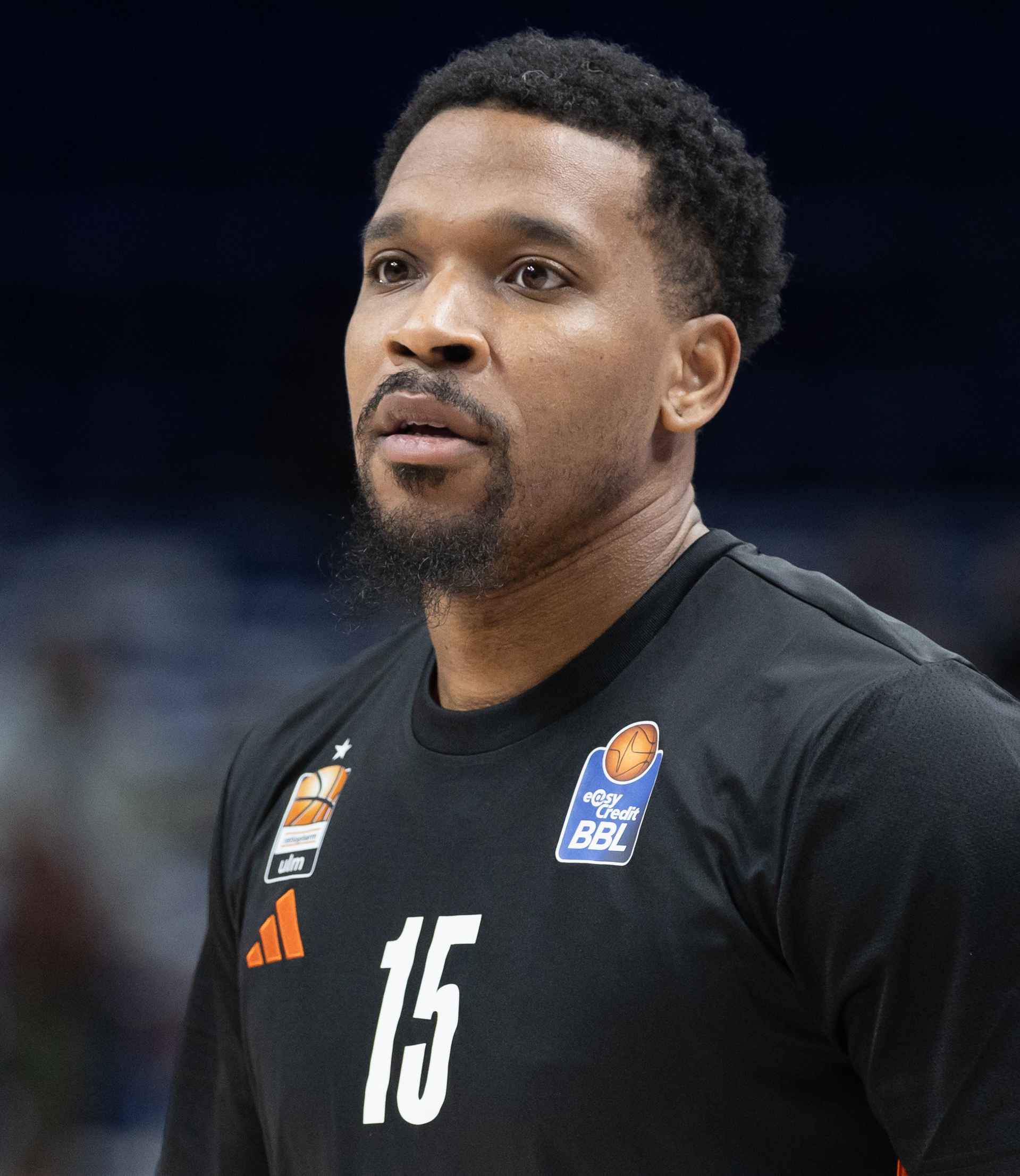
- Simon with ratiopharm Ulm in 2025

No. 5 – Gladiators Trier
- Position: Small forward
- League: Basketball Bundesliga

Personal information
- Born: May 6, 1996 (age 30) Los Angeles, California, U.S.
- Listed height: 6 ft 5 in (1.96 m)
- Listed weight: 215 lb (98 kg)

Career information
- High school: Temecula Valley (Temecula, California); Brewster Academy (Wolfeboro, New Hampshire)
- College: Arizona (2015–2016); St. John's (2017–2019)
- NBA draft: 2019: undrafted
- Playing career: 2019–present

Career history
- 2019–2020: Windy City Bulls
- 2020–2021: Illawarra Hawks
- 2021: ratiopharm Ulm
- 2021–2022: Riesen Ludwigsburg
- 2022–2023: Sydney Kings
- 2023: Scaligera Verona
- 2023–2024: Paris Basketball
- 2024–2025: MHP Riesen Ludwigsburg
- 2025–2026: ratiopharm Ulm
- 2026–present: Gladiators Trier

Career highlights
- EuroCup champion (2024); NBL champion (2023); BBL Best Defender (2022); All-Champions League Defensive Team (2022); NBL Defensive Player of the Year (2021); Big East Defensive Player of the Year (2019)
- Stats at Basketball Reference

Justin D'John Simon (born May 6, 1996) is an American professional basketball player for Gladiators Trier of the Basketball Bundesliga (BBL). He played college basketball for St. John's.

== High school career ==
Simon spent the first three years of his high school career at Temecula Valley High School in his hometown of Temecula, California. In his junior season, Simon averaged 17.5 points, 8.9 rebounds, and 4.2 assists per game, which earned him spots on the all-state underclass and the Division II all-state first teams, in addition to being named the Southwestern League MVP. He also received an invitation to the Men's U-18 National Team training camp.

Simon spent his senior season at Brewster Academy in Wolfeboro, New Hampshire, where he blossomed into a consensus top-40 national recruit in the class of 2015. In leading the team to a 34–1 record, the NEPSAC Class AAA title and the National Prep Championship, Simon averaged 12.5 points, 5.0 rebounds, and 3.5 assists per game.

=== Recruiting ===
Simon finished high school as a four-star recruit and the 37th ranked player in the class of 2015, according to ESPN. Simon received over 20 Division I scholarship offers from the likes of Indiana, Kansas, and Louisville, but ended up selecting Arizona.

College recruiting
Name	Hometown	School	Height	Weight	Commit date
Justin Simon; G	Temecula, CA	Brewster Academy (NH)	6 ft 5 in (1.96 m)	205 lb (93 kg)	May 6, 2014
Justin Simon; G	Recruit ratings: Rivals: 247Sports: (87)				

== College career ==
=== Arizona ===
In his freshman season at Arizona, Simon struggled to find playing time. Early in the season, Simon received an increased amount of minutes due to Allonzo Trier being injured, but his time on the court soon fell off as he failed to see the court in seven of the team's last 11 games. Simon did not start in a game all season and saw action in just 24 contests. In 7.5 minutes per game, Simon averaged 2.3 points and 1.2 rebounds per game.

After the season, Simon announced his intention to transfer. He had interest from several programs, including Oklahoma State, Providence, and New Mexico, but ended up choosing St. John's.

=== St. John's ===
Simon sat out the 2016-17 season due to NCAA transfer rules.

Simon had a breakout sophomore season, tallying 20 double-digit scoring performances and nine double-doubles in 33 games, all of which he started. He averaged 12.2 points, 7.1 rebounds, 5.1 assists, and 2.5 steals per game, and was the only player in the Big East to rank in the top five in rebounding, assists, and steals. Simon ranked eighth nationally in steals with 82.

In his junior season, Simon's offensive production declined slightly but he developed into one of the nation's best defenders. In 34 games, 33 of which he started, Simon averaged 10.4 points and 5.1 rebounds all while leading the team in blocked shots with 22 and ranking third on the team in steals with 50. After the season, Simon was named Big East Defensive Player of the Year.

On April 9, 2019, Simon announced he was forgoing his senior season to declare for the 2019 NBA draft.

=== Statistics ===
Legend
GP	Games played	GS	Games started	MPG	Minutes per game
FG%	Field goal percentage	3P%	3-point field goal percentage	FT%	Free throw percentage
RPG	Rebounds per game	APG	Assists per game	SPG	Steals per game
BPG	Blocks per game	PPG	Points per game	**Bold**	Career high

Year	Team	GP	GS	MPG	FG%	3P%	FT%	RPG	APG	SPG	BPG	PPG
2015–16	Arizona	24	0	7.5	.500	.333	.429	1.2	.3	.3	.3	2.3
2016–17	St. John's	Redshirt										
2017–18	St. John's	33	**33**	**36.1**	.473	**.417**	**.661**	**7.1**	**5.1**	**2.5**	**.8**	**12.2**
2018–19	St. John's	**34**	**33**	32.9	.462	.289	.608	5.1	3.2	1.5	.6	10.4
Career		91	66	27.3	.470	.351	.620	4.8	3.1	1.5	.6	8.9

== Professional career ==
=== Windy City Bulls (2019–2020) ===
Simon was not selected in the draft, but was invited to play for the Chicago Bulls' Summer League team. In five games, he averaged 6.8 points and four rebounds in 21 minutes per game. On September 12, 2019, Simon signed an Exhibit 10 contract with the Bulls and was added to the team's training camp roster. On October 21, Simon was waived from the Bulls' roster and was subsequently assigned to the team's G League affiliate, the Windy City Bulls. He averaged 12.8 points per game in the G League.

=== Illawarra Hawks (2020–2021) ===
On August 14, 2020, Simon signed a one-year deal with the Illawarra Hawks of the Australian National Basketball League (NBL).

=== Ratiopharm Ulm (2021) ===
On August 19, 2021, Simon signed a six-week contract with ratiopharm Ulm of the German Basketball Bundesliga (BBL) as an injury replacement for Karim Jallow.

=== Riesen Ludwigsburg (2021–2022) ===
On October 3, 2021, Simon signed with MHP Riesen Ludwigsburg of the BBL. On May 8, 2022, he helped Riesen finish third in the 2021–22 Basketball Champions League when he recorded 27 points, 6 rebounds, 6 assists and 3 steals against Hapoel Holon, becoming the first player in BCL history to record more than 25 points, 5 rebounds, 5 assists and 2 steals. He also set a new record for points in a BCL Final Four game.

=== Sydney Kings (2022–2023) ===
On July 18, 2022, Simon signed with the Sydney Kings in Australia for the 2022–23 NBL season.

=== Scaligera Verona (2022–2023) ===
On March 20, 2023, Simon signed with Scaligera Verona of the LBA.

=== Bnei Herzliya (2023) ===
On July 18, 2023, Simon signed with Bnei Herzliya of the Israeli Basketball Premier League. He terminated his contract with the club on November 19, 2023.

=== Paris Basketball (2023–2024) ===
On December 1, 2023, he joined Paris Basketball of the LNB Pro A and EuroCup as an injury replacement for Sebastian Herrera. In his first season with the club he won the 2024 EuroCup.

=== Return to Riesen Ludwigsburg (2024–2025) ===
On September 15, 2024, he signed with MHP Riesen Ludwigsburg of the Basketball Bundesliga (BBL) for a second stint.

=== Return to ratiopharm Ulm (2025–2026) ===
In November 2025 he went back to ratiopharm Ulm.

=== Gladiators Trier (2026–present) ===
On May 18, 2026, he signed with Gladiators Trier of the Basketball Bundesliga (BBL).

== Personal life ==
Simon's father Ken played football at Fresno State and his mother Felicia played basketball and ran track at UC Irvine. Simon has two brothers and a sister.
