= Joe Ragland =

American-Liberian basketball player

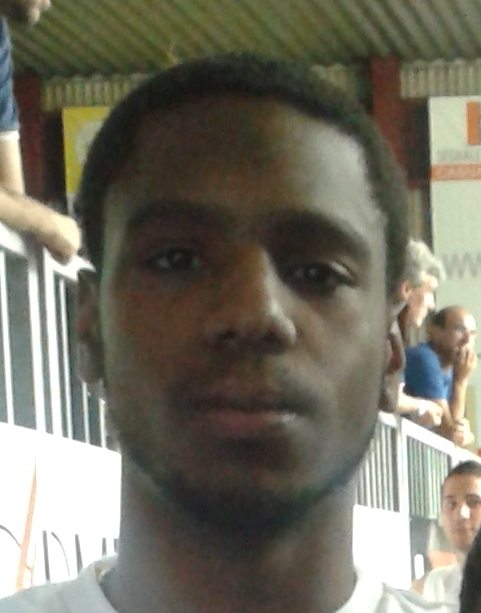
- Ragland in 2013, while at Pallacanestro Cantù

No. 0 – Maccabi Ra'anana
- Position: Point guard
- League: Liga Leumit

Personal information
- Born: November 28, 1989 (age 36) Springfield, Massachusetts, U.S.
- Listed height: 6 ft 0 in (1.83 m)
- Listed weight: 185 lb (84 kg)

Career information
- High school: West Springfield (West Springfield, Massachusetts)
- College: North Platte CC (2008–2010); Wichita State (2010–2012)
- NBA draft: 2012: undrafted
- Playing career: 2012–present

Career history
- 2012–2013: Murcia
- 2013–2014: Cantù
- 2014–2015: Olimpia Milano
- 2015: Karşıyaka
- 2015–2017: Felice Scandone
- 2017–2018: Lokomotiv Kuban
- 2018–2019: Crvena zvezda
- 2019–2020: Cantù
- 2020–2021: Hapoel Eilat
- 2021–2023: Hapoel Holon
- 2023–2024: Peristeri Athens
- 2024–2025: Hapoel Tel Aviv
- 2025: Treviso Basket
- 2025–present: Maccabi Ra'anana

Career highlights
- EuroCup champion (2025); 2× All-FIBA Champions League First Team (2022, 2024); 3× FIBA Champions League assists leader (2022–2024); FIBA Champions League All-Decade Second Team (2026); Italian League All-Star (2014); All-Greek League Second Team (2024); Greek League assists leader (2024); Russian Cup winner (2018); Adriatic League champion (2019); All-Adriatic League Team (2019); Adriatic Supercup winner (2018); Israeli Premier League champion (2022); Israeli Premier League Finals MVP (2022); All-Israeli Premier League First Team (2023); Serbian League champion (2019); NIT champion (2011); First-team All-MVC (2012); First-team NJCAA All-American (2010)

Joseph Alexander Ragland (born November 11, 1989) is an American-Liberian professional basketball player for Maccabi Ra'anana of the Israeli Liga Leumit. He played college basketball for North Platte Community College and the Wichita State Shockers.

== Early life ==
Ragland was born in Springfield, Massachusetts. He played basketball for West Springfield High School, where he earned the Lahovich Award as a senior.

== College career ==
After graduating from high school, Ragland committed to North Platte Community College, of the NJCAA. Ragland was named a First Team NJCAA All-American selection in 2010, as he led his team to an NJCAA tournament appearance, averaging 18.4 points per game, on 56% shooting from the field. Ragland finished his career at North Platte, as the college's all-time leading scorer, with 1,286 total points scored, with career averages of 19.5 points and 3.1 assists per game.

Ragland's performances at North Platte caught the eye of Gregg Marshall, who offered him a scholarship at Wichita State. As a junior with the Shockers, Ragland started 19 games, and led the team in assists. He helped the Shockers to win the 2011 NIT championship. Ragland had a career-high scoring performance against UNLV, with 31 points, to go along with another career high of 8 three-pointers made. In his senior college season, Ragland averaged 13.4 points per game, and ranked first nationally in true shooting percentage, at 70.4%. For his performances in the 2011–12 season, he was voted to the First Team of the Missouri Valley Conference. In total, over his two seasons with the Shockers, Ragland appeared in 69 games, and had averages of 10 points, 3 assists, and 2.3 rebounds per game.

== Professional career ==
Following two solid years as the starting point guard for Wichita State, Ragland entered the 2012 NBA draft. However, he went undrafted. He next played in the 2012 NBA Summer League, with the Golden State Warriors' summer league squad; although he played in all 5 games for the undefeated Warriors summer league team, he was not able to secure an NBA contract with the Warriors.

=== Murcia (2012–2013) ===
In August 2012, Ragland moved to Europe, to start his professional career, after he signed his first pro contract with UCAM Murcia, of the Spanish Liga ACB. He signed a two-year contract with the Spanish club. After accounting himself well for Murcia, who were not in playoff contention, nor in relegation danger, he was loaned near the end of the season, in April 2013.

=== Cantù (2013–2014) ===
In 2013, Ragland was loaned by UCAM Murcia, to the Italian A League side Cantù, to play in the Serie A playoffs. He proved to be an instant hit in Italy, as he played in all of his team's games, and contributed greatly to their run to the league's semi-finals.

Cantù then moved to secure him for the next season, and signed him to a one-year deal in July. It proved to be a wise move for the club, as Ragland became an indisputable starter, and contributed greatly to the team, in both the Italian league, where he made the Lega All-Star Game, and in the European-wide second-tier level EuroCup, where he was the MVP of Round 4 of the competition.

=== Olimpia Milano (2014–2015) ===
Ragland's performances with Cantù caught the eye of the Italian EuroLeague club Emporio Armani Milano, especially after he scored a season-high 27 points against them in April 2014. Ragland signed a two-year contract with Milano in July. Ragland and Milano agreed to rescind the player's contract in July 2015.

=== Karşıyaka (2015) ===
On July 29, 2015, Ragland signed a one-year deal with the Turkish Super League club Pınar Karşıyaka.

=== Avellino (2015–2017) ===
On December 9, 2015, Ragland left Karşıyaka, and he signed with the Italian League club Sidigas Avellino, for the rest of the season. On June 15, 2016, he re-signed with Avellino for one more season.

=== Lokomotiv Kuban (2017–2018) ===
On July 21, 2017, Ragland signed a two-year deal with the Russian VTB United League club Lokomotiv Kuban.

=== Red Star Belgrade (2018–2019) ===
On August 10, 2018, Ragland moved to Belgrade, and signed with the Serbian Adriatic League club Crvena zvezda (Red Star Belgtade), for the 2018–19 season, with an additional option for one more year.

=== Darüşşafaka İstanbul (2019) ===
On July 19, 2019, Ragland signed a one-year deal with the Turkish Super League club Darüşşafaka Tekfen, but he never appeared in any games with the team, because of an injury.

=== Cantu (2019–2020) ===
On 12 December 2019, Ragland returned to Italy, to play in the Serie A, after he signed again with Cantù.

=== Hapoel Eilat (2020–2021) ===
On July 31, 2020, Ragland signed with the Israeli Premier League club Hapoel Eilat. In the 2020–21 season, he was second in the Israel Premier League in assists, with an average of 7.5 per game.

=== Hapoel Holon (2021–2023) ===
On July 21, 2021, Ragland signed with Hapoel Holon, of the Israeli Premier League. Ragland was pivotal in helping Holon win the Israel League championship in the 2021–22 season, which was the club's first league championship in 13 years.

=== Peristeri Athens (2023–2024) ===
On June 23, 2023, Ragland signed with the Greek Basket League club Peristeri Athens.

=== Hapoel Tel Aviv (2024–2025) ===
On June 19, 2024, Ragland signed with Hapoel Tel Aviv of the Ligat HaAl.

=== Treviso Basket (2025–present) ===
On June 24, 2025, he signed with Treviso Basket of the Lega Basket Serie A (LBA).

== Personal life ==
Ragland obtained Liberian citizenship in November 2012. Under the Cotonou Agreement, that allows him to be counted as an EU player in most European leagues, such as the Italian League and the Spanish League.

== Career statistics ==
Legend
GP	Games played	GS	Games started	MPG	Minutes per game
FG%	Field-goal percentage	3P%	3-point field-goal percentage	FT%	Free-throw percentage
RPG	Rebounds per game	APG	Assists per game	SPG	Steals per game
BPG	Blocks per game	PPG	Points per game	PIR	Performance index rating
**Bold**	Career high

=== EuroLeague ===
Year	Team	GP	GS	MPG	FG%	3P%	FT%	RPG	APG	SPG	BPG	PPG	PIR
2014–15	Milano	**24**	**9**	18.6	.386	.346	.828	1.6	2.9	.6	.0	7.2	6.0
2015–16	Karşıyaka	7	5	**25.0**	**.449**	**.357**	**.846**	**3.0**	**3.1**	**.7**	**.1**	**11.9**	**11.7**
Career		31	14	20.0	.405	.349	.833	1.9	3.0	.6	.1	8.3	7.3

=== Domestic leagues ===
Season	Team	League	GP	MPG	FG%	3P%	FT%	RPG	APG	SPG	BPG	PPG
2012–13	Murcia	ACB	25	23.0	.520	.417	.814	2.1	2.4	1.1	.1	11.2
2013–14	Cantù	LBA	33	31.0	.558	.462	.821	3.5	3.4	.9	.2	16.2
2014–15	Milano	LBA	40	23.0	.597	.441	.829	3.0	3.2	.9	.1	11.1
2015–16	Karşıyaka	BSL	6	30.0	.422	.321	.740	3.8	7.7	1.3	.0	13.8
2015–16	Avellino	LBA	30	28.5	.473	.400	.855	3.4	3.8	1.4	.0	13.3
