= David Holston =

American basketball player (born 1986)

No. 11 – JDA Dijon
- Position: Point guard
- League: LNB Élite

Personal information
- Born: January 26, 1986 (age 40) Pontiac, Michigan, U.S.
- Listed height: 5 ft 8 in (1.73 m)
- Listed weight: 160 lb (73 kg)

Career information
- High school: Avondale (Auburn Hills, Michigan)
- College: Chicago State (2005–2009)
- NBA draft: 2009: undrafted
- Playing career: 2009–present

Career history
- 2009–2011: Pınar Karşıyaka
- 2011–2012: Artland Dragons
- 2012–2013: Mersin BB
- 2013–2015: Artland Dragons
- 2015–2017: JDA Dijon
- 2017–2018: Samsun
- 2018–present: JDA Dijon

Career highlights
- LNB Leaders Cup (2020); Pro A Most Valuable Player (2019)

David Rae Leonard Holston (born January 26, 1986) is an American professional basketball player for JDA Dijon Basket of France's LNB Pro A. He played college basketball at Chicago State University (CSU). In 2019, he was named the Most Valuable Player of the French LNB Pro A.

== Early life, education and family ==
David Holston was born in Pontiac, Michigan. He attended Avondale High School in nearby Auburn Hills where he led the team to the 2002 Class B state championship. During his career at Avondale, he earned all-county and all-state honors and scored over 2,000 career points, but he was not offered a college basketball scholarship. He enrolled at Chicago State University in the autumn 2004.

== College athletic career ==
Holston earned a spot on its men's basketball roster as a walk-on. At this time, the school was classified as an Independent Division I school, meaning it had no athletic conference affiliation. He went on to have a prolific career at CSU but received very little national attention due to a confluence of factors: attending a small Division I school that was not in a conference, Chicago State's historically sub-par performance in men's basketball, and his own diminutive 5 ft 8 in (1.73 m) stature.

During Holston's tenure at CSU between 2005–06 and 2008–09 (he redshirted his true freshman season), he scored a school-record 2,331 points, finished in the top five in points per game nationally for his senior season, led the NCAA in three-point field goals made per game in his final two seasons, and was the first Chicago State player to garner Division I postseason All-American honors, among others. Holston finished his collegiate career with averages of 19.6 points, 4.4 assists and 2.1 steals per game, and his 450 career three-pointers were the second-most in NCAA Division I history at the time of his graduation. During his senior season in 2008–09, his averages of 25.9 points, 6.4 assists, 3.7 steals and three rebounds per game led CSU to a 19–13 record—its first winning season since the school transitioned to Division I—and he was named the Independent Player of the Year.

== Professional athletic career ==
Due to his size, Holston was not chosen in the 2009 NBA draft. That July, he signed with Pınar Karşıyaka of the Turkish Basketball League and played for them for two seasons. During his first year, Holston averaged approximately 12 points and four assists per game, and during his second season he averaged roughly 15 points and six assists. He then signed with the Artland Dragons in Germany's Basketball Bundesliga for the 2011–12 season. In the summer of 2012, he signed a contract with Mersin BB of Tukey for the 2012–13 season. In July 2013, he returned to Artland Dragons, and played another two seasons with them.

For the 2018–19 season, Holston played with JDA Dijon of the French LNB Pro A. He led Dijon to third place in the regular season. He was awarded Pro A Most Valuable Player on May 20, 2019.

== See also ==
- List of NCAA Division I men's basketball season 3-point field goal leaders
- List of NCAA Division I men's basketball career 3-point scoring leaders
