= SUNEL Arena =

Greek sporting arena

SUNEL arena
- Ano Liosia Olympic Hall

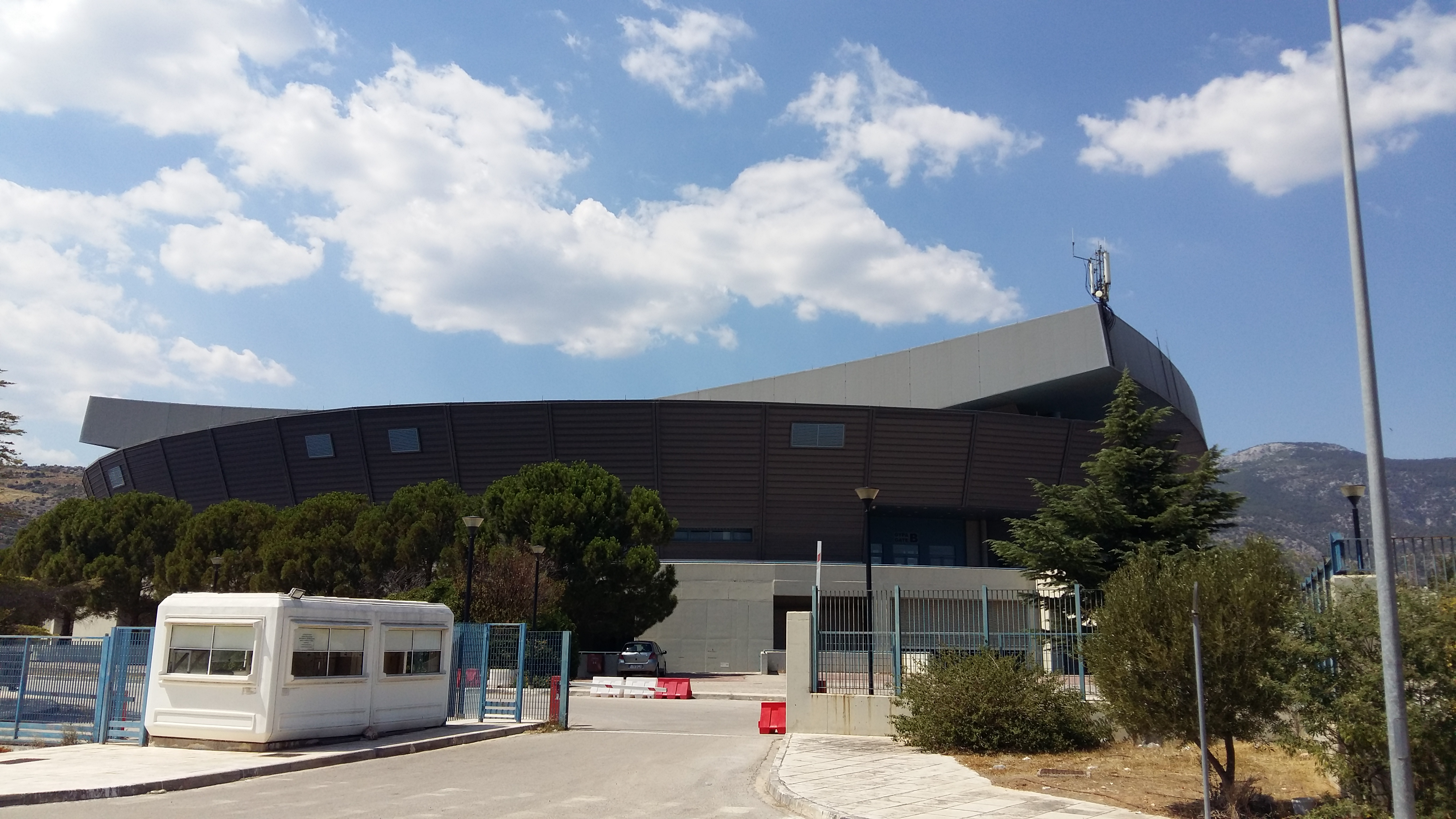
- Interactive map of SUNEL arena
- Address: Konstantinoupoleos 59
- Location: Ano Liosia, Athens, Greece
- Coordinates: 38°04′54″N 23°41′12″E
- Owner: AEK B.C.
- Capacity: Basketball: 9,025; Concerts: 11,600
- Surface: Parquet
- Public transit: Line A2 at Ano Liosia

Construction
- Groundbreaking: 2001
- Opened: 2004
- Renovated: 2021; 2025
- Cost: €84 million euros (2004 money)
- Architects: Molfesis, Genias and associates

Tenant
- AEK B.C. (2021–present)

Website
- sunel-arena.gr

SUNEL Arena (stylised as SUNEL arena), also known as the Ano Liosia Olympic Hall (Greek: Ολυμπιακό Γυμναστήριο Άνω Λιοσίων), is a multi-purpose indoor arena located in Ano Liosia, in the western section of Athens, Greece. Originally built to host martial arts events during the 2004 Athens Summer Olympics, the arena has since been adapted for various uses. In 2021, the arena became the home for AEK B.C., for their games in the Greek Basket League and the Basketball Champions League.

The arena can accommodate 8,327 spectators for sports events with fixed tiered seating. This number rises to 9,327 when the retractable seating is fully extended, allowing for a versatile setup that suits sports events, concerts, and other large-scale gatherings. For AEK BC basketball games, the capacity is 9,025. Additionally, the arena can host up to 11,600 spectators for concerts. It ranks as the third-largest basketball arena in Greece, behind Telekom Center Athens and Peace and Friendship Stadium.

== History ==
=== Athens 2004 and the years after ===
Ano Liosia Olympic Hall was opened in 2004. The arena was used to host the judo and wrestling events at the 2004 Athens Summer Olympics.

After the 2004 Athens Summer Olympics, the venue became the site of various television productions, including the Greek version of the reality show So You Think You Can Dance. At one point in time, the arena was scheduled to be the home of the Hellenic Academy of Culture and Hellenic Digital Archive.

=== AEK B.C. ===
On May 13, 2019, the Greek Government decided to cede the venue to the General Secretariat of Sports, with the aim of subsequently ceding it to AEK B.C. On June 22, 2020, it was announced that the arena's use until the year 2040, was granted to the professional basketball club A.E.K., of the Greek Basket League, in order for the arena to host the home games of the club.

== Basketball ==
=== AEK B.C. ===
A.E.K began using the arena for the 2021–22 season. The club made its unofficial debut at the facilities in a victorious (102-81) friendly match against the London Lions, and its official debut in the context of the Basket League in a victorious (81-69) match against Larisa. The strategic goal is to create a new cultural identity and brand name for the wider region, with the long-term aim being the redevelopment of the surrounding area of the Olympic Center. Serbian player Stevan Jelovac, who played for AEK Athens before his sudden death, was honored by the club with a gesture meant to stand the test of time. The gym of the arena was renamed "Stevan Jelovac Gymnasium" (Greek: «ΓΥΜΝΑΣΤΗΡΙΟ STEVAN JELOVAC»). Jelovac's number 13 jersey was retired by the club during a ceremony on December 14, 2021.

==== AEK BC Academy Sports Center ====
AEK BC completed an air dome structure in the parking lot of Sunel Arena in November 2024. The facility, featuring two basketball courts and a locker room building, hosts academy activities and first-team training sessions.

=== 2025 Basketball Champions League Final Four powered by SUNEL ===
SUNEL Arena hosted the 2025 Basketball Champions League Final Four, featuring AEK, Galatasaray, Unicaja, and Tenerife. It marked Athens' third Final Four and the first at this venue, under a new sustainability-focused partnership between SUNEL Group, FIBA and the BCL.

In the semifinals, Unicaja Málaga defeated AEK Athens 71–65, while Galatasaray overcame La Laguna Tenerife 88–68. AEK claimed third place with a 77–73 comeback win over Tenerife. In the final, Unicaja Málaga secured their second straight title by beating Galatasaray 83–67, with Tyson Carter named MVP.

=== Greece men's national basketball team ===
The SUNEL Arena hosted two crucial FIBA World Cup 2023 qualifying matches for Greece's men's national basketball team. On February 25, 2022, Greece secured a thrilling 72-71 victory against Turkey. A year later, on February 24, 2023, Greece triumphed over Serbia with a 97-92 win in overtime, led by stellar performances from Nikos Rogkavopoulos (28 points) and Dimitris Moraitis (23 points). Despite trailing by 13 points, Greece rallied in the final period and overtime, but could not surpass the point difference from their previous loss to Serbia.

=== Elite League Final 4 ===
The Ano Liosia Olympic Hall hosted the Elite League Final Four from May 17–19, 2024. Milonas claimed the championship after defeating Panionios 87-79 in a thrilling final, securing promotion to the Basket League for the third time in their history. Iraklis beat Ermis Schimatariou 80-73 to face Panionios for the second promotion spot. Panionios claimed the second promotion spot with a 75-70 victory over Iraklis. The match was intense, with Panionios pulling ahead in the final moments thanks to key plays by Milintejevic, Gikas, and Kaklamanakis.

== Naming rights ==
AEK BC and SUNEL Group, on September 18, 2024, announced a major partnership renaming their home arena to "SUNEL Arena". This historic collaboration marks the first time a Greek basketball team has sold the naming rights to its home arena. The arena, a former Olympic facility, is set to become the first in Greece to achieve a zero carbon footprint as part of a long-term sustainability project.The five-year agreement, running through 2029, reflects AEK's environmental commitment, with an option to extend the deal for an additional 10 years until 2039. SUNEL, an energy group operating in 12 countries, specializes in renewable energy and energy efficiency solutions.

== Accessibility and transportation ==
To access the SUNEL Arena fans have several transportation options. Those using public transport can take the suburban railway (Proastiakos) to Ano Liosia Station and then transfer to bus line 749 that stops outside the Olympic Hall. Additionally, metro users can take bus line B12 from the Attiki Metro Station and disembark at the 23rd stop on Fylis Street (Greek: 23η ΦΥΛΗΣ), which is a 15 minutes walk to the venue. For those driving, exit 5 on the Attiki Odos highway provides easy access to the arena, with parking available.

== Other uses ==
=== Concerts ===
SUNEL Arena has quickly established itself as a premier destination for live music, with a seating capacity of 8,600 and an arena floor accommodating 3,000 standing or 1,200 seated attendees. On November 16, 2024, it hosted its first rap concert, headlined by Albanian superstar Noizy, joined by Greek trap icon Light and other Greek artists, drawing over 3,000 fans. A week later, on November 23, the arena transformed for its debut techno event, featuring Amelie Lens and KI/KI, supported by Greek DJs.

=== Tennis ===
In February 2024, Greece faced Romania in the Davis Cup World Group I playoffs at the Ano Liosia Olympic Hall, marking a critical match for the Greek team. Led by Stefanos Tsitsipas, the Greek team secured a decisive 3-0 victory. Tsitsipas won his singles match on the first day, while his brother, Petros Tsitsipas, teamed up with him for a thrilling doubles victory against Romania’s Marius Copil and Victor Vlad Cornea. The Tsitsipas brothers overcame an initial set loss to win the match 6-7(4), 6-3, 6-4, sealing Greece’s spot in the World Group I for only the second time in its history.

=== Handball ===
The final of the Greek Men's Handball Cup took place on March 19, 2014, at the Ano Liosia Olympic Hall. It was AEK's first match in this venue, where they defeated Diomidis Argous 18–16 to win their third Greek Cup. Since then, AEK's handball team has played several games for the Greek Men's Handball Championship and the EHF European Cup at the SUNEL Arena.

SUNEL Arena hosted the 2025 Greek Men's Handball Cup Final 4, featuring the semifinals Zafeirakis Naousa – AEK (24–40) and Vrilissia – Diomidis Argous (31–22). In the final, AEK delivered a dominant 43–21 win over Vrilissia, securing the club’s fifth Greek Men’s Handball Cup title.

=== Ice Hockey ===
From May 19 to June 6, 2010 the arena hosted the Greek Ice Hockey Championship, where Iptamenoi Pagodromoi Athinai claimed the men’s title.

=== Karate ===
The Ano Liosia Olympic Hall has hosted the WKF Karate 1 Series A twice, in January 2023 and 2024. These events attracted over 1,100 athletes from more than 70 countries each year. The tournaments marked significant milestones for Greek Karate.

== Gallery ==
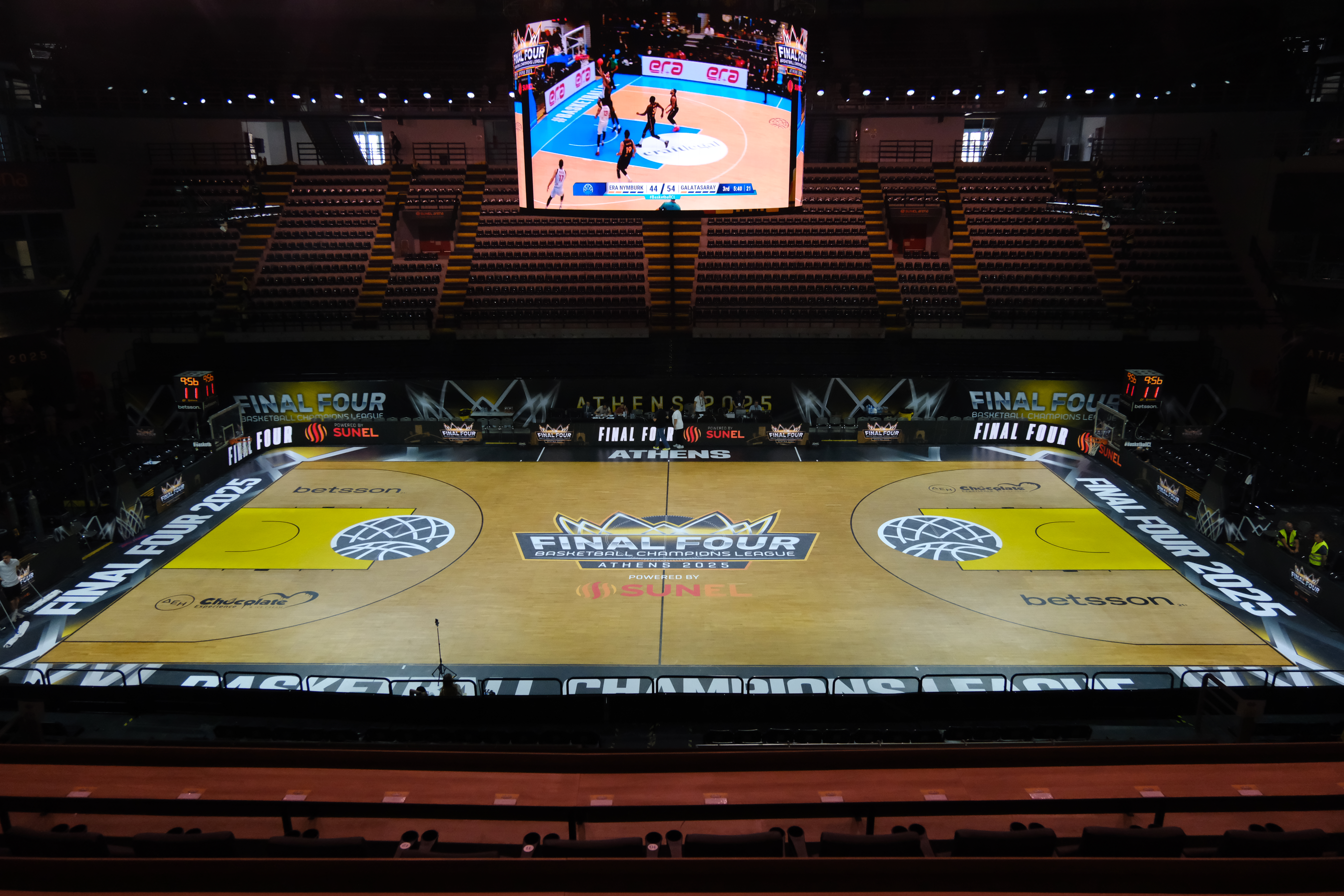
SUNEL Arena during 2025 Basketball Champions League Final Four

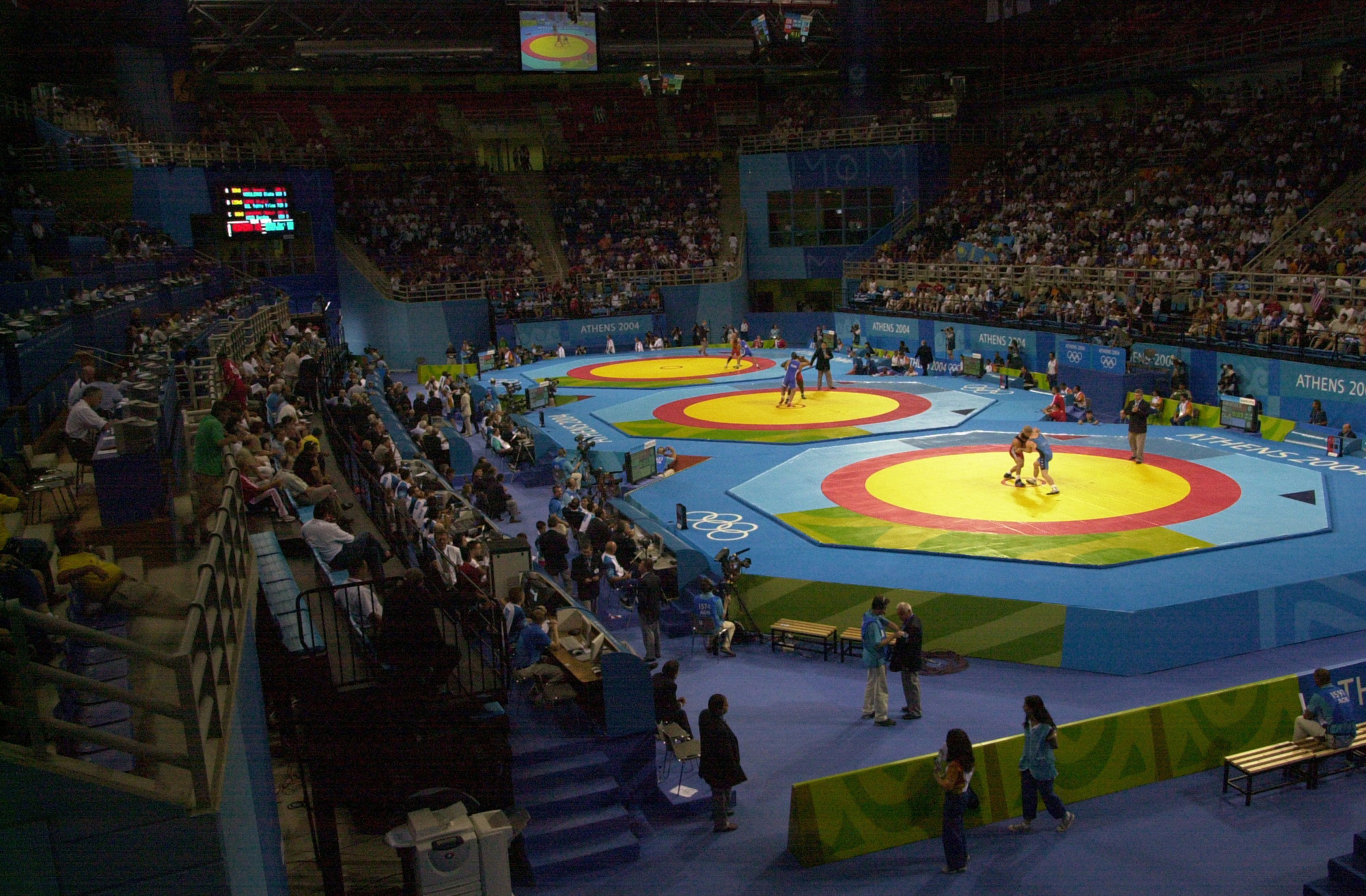
SUNEL Arena During 2004 Summer Olympics

== See also ==
- List of indoor arenas in Greece
- AEK B.C.#Arenas
- Basketball Champions League Final Four#Arenas
- 2004 Summer Olympics#Venues
