= 2024–25 Basketball Champions League =

European basketball competition

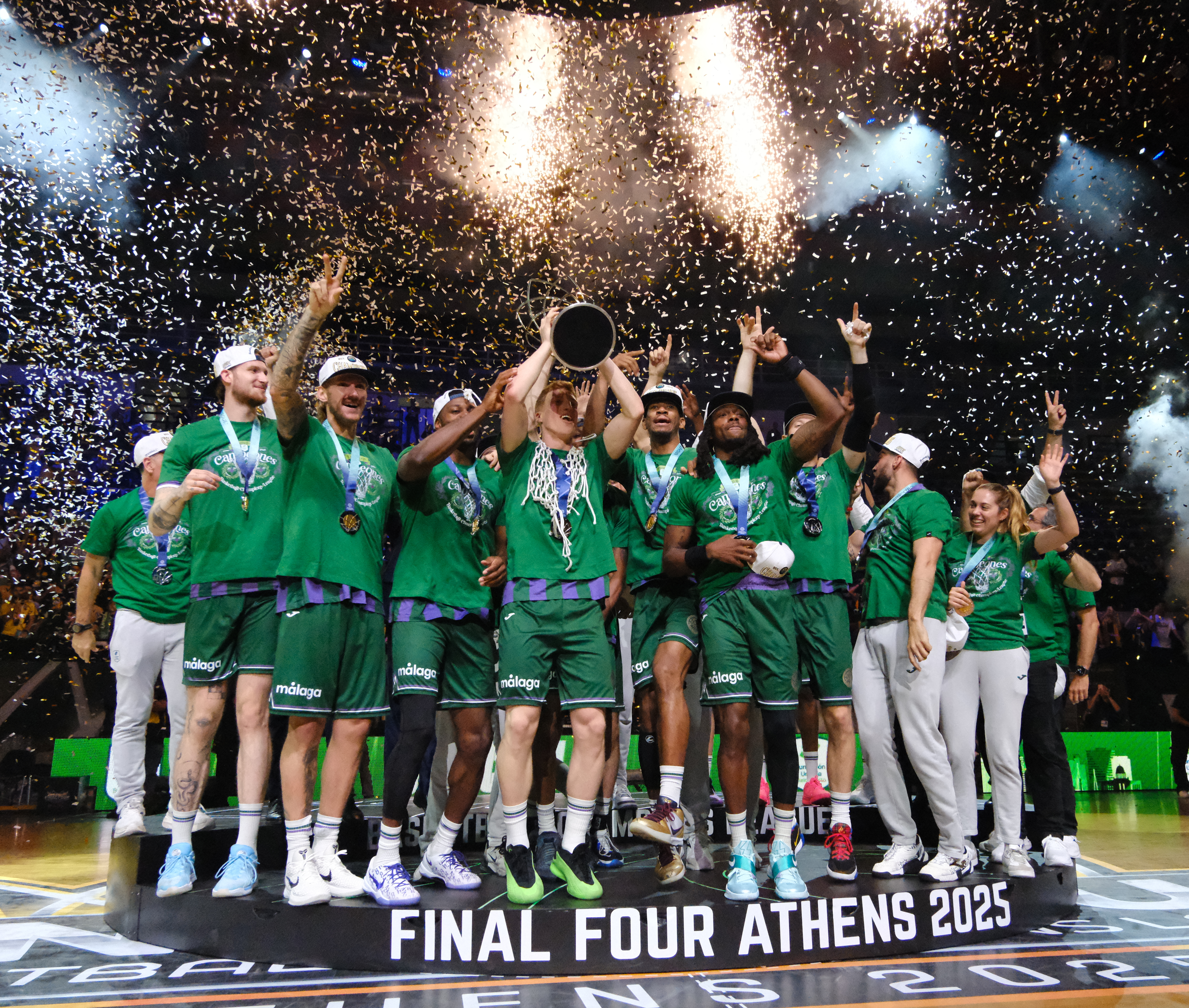
- Unicaja Cup Ceremony
- Season: 2024–25
- Dates: Qualifying: 15–22 September 2024; Competition proper: 1 October 2024 – 11 May 2025
- Teams: Competition proper: 32; Total: 52 (from 29 countries)

Regular season
- Season MVP: Marcelo Huertas (Tenerife)

Finals
- Champions: (Spain) Unicaja (2nd title)
- Runners-up: (Turkey) Galatasaray
- Third place: (Greece) AEK Betsson BC
- Fourth place: (Spain) Lenovo Tenerife
- Final Four MVP: Tyson Carter (Unicaja)

Awards
- Best Coach: Txus Vidorreta
- Best Young Player: Nolan Traoré

Statistical leaders
| Points | Amin Stevens (Ironi Ramat Gan) | 21.9 |
| Rebounds | Kenneth Faried (Reggiana) | 7.9 |
| Assists | Kendale McCullum (Ironi Ramat Gan) | 7.9 |

The 2024–25 Basketball Champions League was the 9th season of the Basketball Champions League (BCL), the European professional basketball competition for clubs launched by FIBA. The season began on 1 October 2024 and ended on 11 May 2025.

Unicaja Málaga were the defending champions, and successfully defended their title by defeating Galatasaray in the final of the Final Four, which was hosted in the Sunel Arena in Athens for a second time in history.

== Team allocation ==
The country ranking based on the country coefficients is used to determine the number of clubs from each national federation that enters various stages of the BCL:

- All countries, if they entered, each have at least one team qualify.
- The winners of the 2023–24 Basketball Champions League are given an additional entry if they do not qualify for the 2024–25 Basketball Champions League through their domestic league.
- The organiser may grant access to the League through the attribution of up to 4 invitations (wild cards) to the Regular Season or to the Qualification Rounds.
- If one or more clubs do not use their right to participate in the Basketball Champions League, the organiser may decide to allocate the respective place(s) to other clubs of the same or other National Federations.

=== National Federations ranking ===
For the 2024–25 Basketball Champions League, the countries are allocated places according to their 2024 country coefficients, which takes into account their performance from 2021–22 to 2023–24.

National Federations ranking for 2024–25 Basketball Champions League

| Rank | National Federation | Coeff. | Teams |
|---|---|---|---|
| 1 | Spain | 103.40 | 4+1 BCL |
| 2 | Israel | 71.67 | 2 |
| 3 | France | 70.16 | 3 |
| 4 | Turkey | 65.20 | 4 |
| 5 | Greece | 60.75 | 5 |
| 6 | Germany | 60.50 | 4 |
| 7 | Hungary | 44.00 | 1 |
| 8 | Romania | 41.00 | 1 |
| 9 | Lithuania | 39.00 | 2 |
| 10 | Bosnia and Herzegovina | 37.00 | 1 |
| 11 | Belgium | 36.50 | 2 |
| 12 | Italy | 33.42 | 3 |
| 13 | Latvia | 31.00 | 1 |
| 14 | Portugal | 27.00 | 1 |
| 15 | Ukraine | 25.00 | 0 |
| 16 | Poland | 22.50 | 2 |
| 17 | Czech Republic | 18.00 | 1 |
| 18 | Estonia | 13.00 | 1 |
| 19 | Denmark | 12.00 | 0 |
| 20 | Russia (suspended) | 7.50 | 0 |
| 21 | Switzerland | 7.00 | 1 |
| 22 | Netherlands | 6.00 | 1 |
| 23 | Sweden | 5.00 | 1 |

| Rank | National Federation | Coeff. | Teams |
|---|---|---|---|
| 24 | Cyprus | 5.00 | 1 |
| 25 | Slovakia | 5.00 | 1 |
| 26 | Serbia | 5.00 | 2 |
| 27 | Finland | 4.00 | 1 |
| 28 | Belarus (suspended) | 4.00 | 0 |
| 29 | Montenegro | 3.00 | 0 |
| 30 | Austria | 3.00 | 0 |
| 31 | Kosovo | 2.00 | 1 |
| 32 | Great Britain | 2.00 | 1 |
| 33 | Croatia | 2.00 | 0 |
| 34 | Georgia | 1.00 | 1 |
| 35 | Bulgaria | 1.00 | 1 |
| 36 | North Macedonia | 1.00 | 0 |
| NR | Azerbaijan | — | 1 |
| NR | Albania | — | 0 |
| NR | Armenia | — | 0 |
| NR | Iceland | — | 0 |
| NR | Ireland | — | 0 |
| NR | Luxembourg | — | 0 |
| NR | Moldova | — | 0 |
| NR | Norway | — | 0 |
| NR | Slovenia | — | 0 |

=== Teams ===
The labels in the parentheses show how each team qualified for the place of its starting round:

- TH: Title holders
- FEC: FIBA Europe Cup title holders
- 1st, 2nd, 3rd, 4th, etc.: League positions of the previous season
- WC: Wild card
- AV: Allocated vacancy

Qualified teams for 2024–25 Basketball Champions League (by entry round)
Regular season
| (Hellenic Basketball Federation) Peristeri Domino's (3rd) | (German Basketball Federation) Niners Chemnitz (3rd)^{FEC} | (Israeli Basketball Association) Maccabi Ironi Ramat Gan (5th) | (Hungarian Basketball Federation) Falco-Vulcano Szombathely (1st) |
| (Hellenic Basketball Federation) Promitheas Patras (5th) | (German Basketball Federation) FIT/One Würzburg Baskets (4th) | (Israeli Basketball Association) Hapoel Netanel Holon (6th) | (Latvian Basketball Association) VEF Rīga (1st) |
| (Hellenic Basketball Federation) Kolossos H Hotels (6th) | (German Basketball Federation) Rasta Vechta (6th) | (Italian Basketball Federation) Pallacanestro Reggiana (5th) | (Lithuanian Basketball Federation) Rytas (1st) |
| (Hellenic Basketball Federation) AEK Betsson (7th) | (Turkish Basketball Federation) Pinar Karşıyaka (4th) | (Italian Basketball Federation) Bertram Derthona Tortona (8th) | (Basketball Federation of Serbia) FMP Soccerbet (4th) |
| (Spanish Basketball Federation) UCAM Murcia (2nd) | (Turkish Basketball Federation) Galatasaray (5th) | (Polish Basketball Federation) King Szczecin (2nd)^{AV} | |
| (Spanish Basketball Federation) Unicaja (3rd)^{TH} | (Turkish Basketball Federation) Manisa BBSK (6th) | (Polish Basketball Federation) Śląsk Wrocław (3rd) | |
| (Spanish Basketball Federation) La Laguna Tenerife (6th) | (French Federation of Basketball) Nanterre 92 (5th) | (Basketball Belgium) Filou Oostende (1st) | |
| (Spanish Basketball Federation) BAXI Manresa (8th) | (French Federation of Basketball) Saint-Quentin Basket-Ball (6th) | (Basketball Federation of Bosnia and Herzegovina) Igokea m:tel (1st) | |
Qualifying rounds
| (Azerbaijan Basketball Federation) Sabah (1st) | (Basketball Finland) Nokia (1st) | (Italian Basketball Federation) Dinamo Banco di Sardegna Sassari (10th) | (Basketball Federation of Serbia) Spartak Office Shoes (7th) |
| (Basketball Belgium) Windrose Giants Antwerp (2nd) | (French Federation of Basketball) Cholet (7th) | (Basketball Federation of Kosovo) Trepça (1st) | (Slovak Basketball Association) Patrioti Levice (1st) |
| (Bulgarian Basketball Federation) Rilski Sportist (1st) | (Georgian Basketball Federation) Kutaisi 2010 (1st) | (Lithuanian Basketball Federation) Juventus (5th) | (Spanish Basketball Federation) Morabanc Andorra (11th) |
| (Czech Basketball Federation) ERA Nymburk (1st) | (German Basketball Federation) Telekom Baskets Bonn (7th) | (Basketball Nederland) Heroes den Bosch (2nd) | (Swedish Basketball Federation) Norrköping Dolphins 1st) |
| (Cyprus Basketball Federation) Keravnos (1st) | (British Basketball) Caledonia Gladiators (5th) | (Portuguese Basketball Federation) SL Benfica (1st) | (Swiss Basketball) Fribourg Olympic (1st) |
| (Estonian Basketball Association) Kalev/Cramo (1st) | (Hellenic Basketball Federation) PAOK mateco (8th) | (Romanian Basketball Federation) CSM CSU Oradea (2nd) | (Turkish Basketball Federation) Petkim Spor (7th) |

Notes

1. Netherlands (NED): ZZ Leiden would have qualified as the winners of the 2023-24 BNXT Dutch Playoffs, but withdrew from applying because their arena did not meet FIBA Europe's capacity standards. As a result, the spot was given to Heroes Den Bosch, second in the national league.

== Referees ==
A total of 54 officials are set to work on the 2024–25 season in Basketball Champions League: After the 2023–24 season, five referees left the squad, two were added.

Referees of the 2024−25 season
| (Belgium) Geert Jacobs; (Bosnia and Herzegovina) Ademir Zurapović; (Bulgaria) Martin Horozov; (Bulgaria) Ventsislav Velikov; (Croatia) Josip Jurčević; (Croatia) Martin Vulić; (Cyprus) Ilias Kounelles; (Czech Republic) Ivor Matějek; (Estonia) Mihkel Männiste; (France) Alexandre Deman; (France) Nicolas Maestre; (France) Valentin Oliot; (France) Yohan Rosso; (Germany) Carsten Straube; (Greece) Georgios Poursanidis; (Hungary) Péter Praksch; (Hungary) Cecilia Montgomery-Toth; (Israel) Ofer Manheim | (Italy) Lorenzo Baldini; (Italy) Saverio Lanzarini; (Italy) Manuel Mazzoni; (Latvia) Andris Aunkrogers; (Latvia) Mārtiņš Kozlovskis; (Latvia) Gatis Saliņš; (Lithuania) Juozas Barkauskas; (Lithuania) Gvidas Gedvilas; (Lithuania) Gintaras Mačiulis; (North Macedonia) Igor Mitrovski; (Norway) Gizella Viola Györgyi; (Panama) Julio Anaya; (Poland) Wojciech Liszka; (Poland) Michał Proc; (Poland) Dariusz Zapolski; (Portugal) Paulo Marques; (Romania) Marius Ciulin; (Serbia) Aleksandar Glišić | (Serbia) Petar Pesic; (Serbia) Siniša Prpa; (Slovakia) Marek Kúkelčík; (Slovakia) Zdenko Tomašovič; (Slovenia) Boris Krejić; (Slovenia) Blaž Zupančič; (Spain) Fernando Calatrava; (Spain) Luis Castillo; (Spain) Antonio Conde; (Spain) Ariadna Chueca; (Spain) Alberto Sánchez; (Turkey) Kerem Baki; (Turkey) Orhan Cagri Hekimoglu; (Turkey) Mehmet Karabilecen; (Turkey) Can Mavisu; (Turkey) Yener Yılmaz; (Turkey) Zafer Yılmaz; (Ukraine) Sergiy Zashchuk |

== Qualifying rounds ==
=== Draw ===
The draw for the qualifying rounds was held on 26 June 2024 at the Patrick Baumann House in Mies, Switzerland.

The 24 teams will face in four qualifying round tournaments, two of which belong to the Champions Path, which contains the domestic league champions, and the other two to the League Path, which contains the rest of the teams that vie for qualify to the regular season. In each path, teams were seeded into the six pots ordered by the club ranking and by the country ranking for clubs that have not yet participated in the competition. Teams from pot 1 and pot 2 were drawn directly into the semi-finals of the tournaments, while the teams in the other four pots will enter the tournament from the quarter-finals. The four winners of the finals will then qualify for the regular season and join the 28 directly qualified teams in the main draw. The rest of the teams will qualify, if they apply, to the FIBA Europe Cup.

==== Champions paths ====
Pot 1
| Team | Pts |
|---|---|
| (Portuguese Basketball Federation) SL Benfica | 25 |
| (Czech Basketball Federation) ERA Nymburk | 22 |

Pot 2
| Team | Pts |
|---|---|
| (Estonian Basketball Association) Kalev/Cramo | 12 |
| (Swiss Basketball) Fribourg Olympic | 7 |

Pot 3
| Team | Pts |
|---|---|
| (Slovak Basketball Association) Patrioti Levice | 5 |
| (Swedish Basketball Federation) Norrköping Dolphins | 5 |

Pot 4
| Team | Pts |
|---|---|
| (Cyprus Basketball Federation) Keravnos | 2 |
| (Basketball Finland) Nokia | 4.00^{†} |

Pot 5
| Team | Pts |
|---|---|
| (Basketball Federation of Kosovo) Trepça | 2.00^{†} |
| (Bulgarian Basketball Federation) Rilski Sportist | 1.00^{†} |

Pot 6
| Team | Pts |
|---|---|
| (Georgian Basketball Federation) Kutaisi 2010 | 1.00^{†} |
| (Azerbaijan Basketball Federation) Sabah | 0.00^{†} |

==== League paths ====
Pot 1
| Team | Pts |
|---|---|
| (German Basketball Federation) Telekom Baskets Bonn | 80 |
| (Hellenic Basketball Federation) PAOK Mateco | 43 |

Pot 2
| Team | Pts |
|---|---|
| (Italian Basketball Federation) Banco di Sardegna Sassari | 33 |
| (French Federation of Basketball) Cholet | 11 |

Pot 3
| Team | Pts |
|---|---|
| (Basketball Nederland) Heroes den Bosch | 4 |
| (Lithuanian Basketball Federation) Juventus | 2 |

Pot 4
| Team | Pts |
|---|---|
| (Romanian Basketball Federation) CSM Oradea | 1 |
| (Basketball Belgium) Windrose Giants Antwerp | 1 |

Pot 5
| Team | Pts |
|---|---|
| (British Basketball) Caledonia Gladiators | 0 |
| (Spanish Basketball Federation) MoraBanc Andorra | 103.40^{†} |

Pot 6
| Team | Pts |
|---|---|
| (Turkish Basketball Federation) Petkim Spor | 65.20^{†} |
| (Basketball Federation of Serbia) Spartak Office Shoes | 5.00^{†} |

Notes

^† Indicates teams with no club points, therefore using the country points as a tiebreaker.

=== Tournament 1 ===
The tournament 1 will be played on September 17–21, 2024 at the Gloria Sports Arena in Antalya, Turkey.

Quarter-finals
September 17
(Bulgarian Basketball Federation) Rilski Sportist | 71
(Basketball Finland) Nokia | 64
September 17
(Azerbaijan Basketball Federation) Sabah | 71
(Swedish Basketball Federation) Norrköping Dolphins | 75

Semi-finals
September 19
(Portuguese Basketball Federation) Benfica | 89
(Bulgarian Basketball Federation) Rilski Sportist | 88
September 19
(Swiss Basketball) Fribourg Olympic | 80
(Swedish Basketball Federation) Norrköping Dolphins | 79

Final
September 21
(Portuguese Basketball Federation) Benfica | 91
(Swiss Basketball) Fribourg Olympic | 85

Source: FIBA

=== Tournament 2 ===
The tournament 2 will be played on September 18–22, 2024 at the Gloria Sports Arena in Antalya, Turkey.

Quarter-finals
September 18
(Basketball Federation of Kosovo) Trepça | 82
(Cyprus Basketball Federation) Keravnos | 79
September 18
(Georgian Basketball Federation) Kutaisi 2010 | 87
(Slovak Basketball Association) Patrioti Levice | 111

Semi-finals
September 20
(Czech Basketball Federation) ERA Nymburk | 84
(Basketball Federation of Kosovo) Trepça | 78
September 20
(Estonian Basketball Association) Kalev/Cramo | 84
(Slovak Basketball Association) Patrioti Levice | 76

Final
September 22
(Czech Basketball Federation) ERA Nymburk | 80
(Estonian Basketball Association) Kalev/Cramo | 66

Source: FIBA

=== Tournament 3 ===
The tournament 3 will be played on September 17–21, 2024 at the Gloria Sports Arena in Antalya, Turkey.

Quarter-finals
September 17
(British Basketball) Caledonia Gladiators | 59
(Romanian Basketball Federation) CSM Oradea | 90
September 17
(Turkish Basketball Federation) Petkim Spor | 92
(Basketball Nederland) Heroes Den Bosch | 72

Semi-finals
September 19
(Hellenic Basketball Federation) PAOK mateco | 81
(Romanian Basketball Federation) CSM Oradea | 80
September 19
(French Federation of Basketball) Cholet | 70
(Turkish Basketball Federation) Petkim Spor | 76

Final
September 21
(Hellenic Basketball Federation) PAOK mateco | 69
(Turkish Basketball Federation) Petkim Spor | 79

Source: FIBA

=== Tournament 4 ===
The tournament 4 will be played on September 18–22, 2024 at the Gloria Sports Arena in Antalya, Turkey.

Quarter-finals
September 18
(Spanish Basketball Federation) MoraBanc Andorra | 91
(Basketball Belgium) Windrose Giants Antwerp | 73
September 18
(Basketball Federation of Serbia) Spartak Office Shoes | 84
(Lithuanian Basketball Federation) Juventus | 87

Semi-finals
September 20
(German Basketball Federation) Telekom Baskets Bonn | 99
(Spanish Basketball Federation) MoraBanc Andorra | 91
September 20
(Italian Basketball Federation) Banco di Sardegna Sassari | 77
(Lithuanian Basketball Federation) Juventus | 73

Final
September 22
(German Basketball Federation) Telekom Baskets Bonn | 78
(Italian Basketball Federation) Banco di Sardegna Sassari | 71

Source: FIBA

== Regular season ==
The 28 teams that entered in the regular season directly were divided into four pots based firstly on the club ranking and, for clubs that have not yet participated in the (Regular season of) competition, on the three-year country ranking. The country protection rule will apply for the stage of the draw. Clubs cannot be drawn in groups with other clubs from the same country.

The 28 teams will play against each other in a group phase of eight groups with four teams. The first placed team of each group will directly join the Round of 16. The second and third placed teams will play in the Play Ins. The winner of each Play In match will join the Round of 16. Play Ins will be played in a Best of 3 format. In the Round of 16 the teams will be split in four groups of four teams. Each team plays against each other team in the Round of 16. The two first placed teams of each group will qualify for the Quarterfinals. The Quarterfinals will be played in a Best of 3 format. The winner of each Quarterfinal will be allowed to take place in the Basketball Champions League Final Four in May 2025.

Pot 1
| Team | Pts |
|---|---|
| (Spain) La Laguna Tenerife | 144 |
| (Spain) Unicaja | 138 |
| (Israel) Hapoel Netanel Holon | 92 |
| (Spanish Basketball Federation) Baxi Manresa | 88 |
| (Turkey) Galatasaray Basketbol | 76 |
| (Lithuania) Rytas | 69 |
| (Spain) UCAM Murcia | 68 |
| (Greece) AEK Betsson | 65 |

Pot 2
| Team | Pts |
|---|---|
| (Greece) Peristeri | 55 |
| (Belgium) Filou Oostende | 55 |
| (Turkey) Karşıyaka Basket | 52 |
| (Hungary) Falco Szombathely | 49 |
| (Bosnia and Herzegovina) Igokea | 37 |
| (Latvia) VEF Rīga | 31 |
| (Greece) Promitheas | 30 |
| (Italy) Bertram Derthona Tortona | 21 |

Pot 3
| Team | Pts |
|---|---|
| (German Basketball Federation) Rasta Vechta | 17 |
| (Poland) King Szczecin | 11 |
| (Italian Basketball Federation) Pallacanestro Reggiana | 11 |
| (German Basketball Federation) Niners Chemnitz | 4 |
| (Israeli Basketball Association) Maccabi Ironi Ramat Gan | 71.67^{†} |
| (French Federation of Basketball) Nanterre 92 | 70.16^{†} |
| (French Federation of Basketball) Saint-Quentin | 70.16^{†} |
| (Turkish Basketball Federation) Manisa Basket | 65.20^{†} |

Pot 4
| Team | Pts |
|---|---|
| (Hellenic Basketball Federation) Kolossos H Hotels | 60.75^{†} |
| (German Basketball Federation) Würzburg Baskets | 60.50^{†} |
| (Polish Basketball Federation) Śląsk Wrocław | 22.50^{†} |
| (Basketball Federation of Serbia) FMP Soccerbet | 5.00^{†} |
(Winner QF–T1)
(Winner QF–T2)
(Winner QF–T3)
(Winner QF–T4)

Notes

^† Indicates teams with no club points, therefore using the country points as a tiebreaker.

=== Group A ===
| Pos | Team | Pld | W | L | PF | PA | PD | Pts | Qualification | WUE | NAN | HOL | IGO |
|---|---|---|---|---|---|---|---|---|---|---|---|---|---|
| 1 | (Germany) FIT/One Würzburg Baskets | 6 | 4 | 2 | 513 | 489 | +24 | 10 | Advance to round of 16 | — | 88–96 | 85–76 | 98–80 |
| 2 | (France) Nanterre 92 | 6 | 3 | 3 | 500 | 492 | +8 | 9 | Advance to play-ins | 83–88 | — | 87–77 | 78–83 |
| 3 | (Israel) Hapoel Netanel Holon | 6 | 3 | 3 | 472 | 478 | −6 | 9 | Advance to play-ins | 71–69 | 70–76 | — | 92–82 |
| 4 | (Bosnia and Herzegovina) Igokea m:tel | 6 | 2 | 4 | 493 | 519 | −26 | 8 | | 83–85 | 86–80 | 79–86 | — |

Source: Group Standings
Legend: Blue = home team win; Red = away team win.

=== Group B ===
| Pos | Team | Pld | W | L | PF | PA | PD | Pts | Qualification | UNI | PET | OOS | SZC |
|---|---|---|---|---|---|---|---|---|---|---|---|---|---|
| 1 | (Spain) Unicaja | 6 | 6 | 0 | 584 | 432 | +152 | 12 | Advance to round of 16 | — | 112–82 | 98–82 | 83–60 |
| 2 | (Turkey) Petkim Spor | 6 | 4 | 2 | 475 | 503 | −28 | 10 | Advance to play-ins | 56–108 | — | 77–74 | 90–63 |
| 3 | (Belgium) Filou Oostende | 6 | 2 | 4 | 468 | 480 | −12 | 8 | Advance to play-ins | 85–92 | 76–85 | — | 67–55 |
| 4 | (Poland) King Szczecin | 6 | 0 | 6 | 388 | 500 | −112 | 6 | | 67–91 | 70–85 | 73–84 | — |

Source: Group Standings
Legend: Blue = home team win; Red = away team win.

=== Group C ===
| Pos | Team | Pld | W | L | PF | PA | PD | Pts | Qualification | TFE | KSK | SAI | KOL |
|---|---|---|---|---|---|---|---|---|---|---|---|---|---|
| 1 | (Spain) La Laguna Tenerife | 6 | 6 | 0 | 502 | 396 | +106 | 12 | Advance to round of 16 | — | 85–82 | 96–57 | 93–74 |
| 2 | (Turkey) Pinar Karşıyaka | 6 | 4 | 2 | 501 | 451 | +50 | 10 | Advance to play-ins | 76–87 | — | 84–74 | 95–79 |
| 3 | (France) Saint-Quentin | 6 | 2 | 4 | 429 | 473 | −44 | 8 | Advance to play-ins | 61–71 | 67–93 | — | 84–54 |
| 4 | (Greece) Kolossos H Hotels | 6 | 0 | 6 | 387 | 499 | −112 | 6 | | 47–71 | 59–71 | 75–86 | — |

Source: Group Standings
Legend: Blue = home team win; Red = away team win.

=== Group D ===
| Pos | Team | Pld | W | L | PF | PA | PD | Pts | Qualification | NYM | GAL | PRO | VEC |
|---|---|---|---|---|---|---|---|---|---|---|---|---|---|
| 1 | (Czech Republic) ERA Nymburk | 6 | 5 | 1 | 516 | 452 | +64 | 11 | Advance to round of 16 | — | 80–70 | 75–85 | 93–74 |
| 2 | (Turkey) Galatasaray | 6 | 4 | 2 | 492 | 471 | +21 | 10 | Advance to play-ins | 75–87 | — | 91–74 | 103–91 |
| 3 | (Greece) Promitheas | 6 | 2 | 4 | 478 | 503 | −25 | 8 | Advance to play-ins | 78–86 | 75–79 | — | 78–86 |
| 4 | (Germany) Rasta Vechta | 6 | 1 | 5 | 471 | 531 | −60 | 7 | | 70–95 | 64–74 | 86–88 | — |

Source: Group Standings
Legend: Blue = home team win; Red = away team win.

=== Group E ===
| Pos | Team | Pld | W | L | PF | PA | PD | Pts | Qualification | AEK | BON | MRG | RIG |
|---|---|---|---|---|---|---|---|---|---|---|---|---|---|
| 1 | (Greece) AEK Betsson | 6 | 4 | 2 | 494 | 463 | +31 | 10 | Advance to round of 16 | — | 96–65 | 80–71 | 80–70 |
| 2 | (Germany) Telekom Baskets Bonn | 6 | 4 | 2 | 474 | 485 | −11 | 10 | Advance to play-ins | 93–74 | — | 80–76 | 78–75 |
| 3 | (Israel) Maccabi Ironi Ramat Gan | 6 | 3 | 3 | 492 | 494 | −2 | 9 | Advance to play-ins | 95–84 | 78–86 | — | 78–71 |
| 4 | (Latvia) VEF Rīga | 6 | 1 | 5 | 464 | 482 | −18 | 7 | | 69–80 | 86–72 | 93–94 | — |

Source: Group Standings
Legend: Blue = home team win; Red = away team win.

=== Group F ===
| Pos | Team | Pld | W | L | PF | PA | PD | Pts | Qualification | RYT | FAL | PAL | SLA |
|---|---|---|---|---|---|---|---|---|---|---|---|---|---|
| 1 | (Lithuania) Rytas | 6 | 5 | 1 | 542 | 479 | +63 | 11 | Advance to round of 16 | — | 103–83 | 94–84 | 98–75 |
| 2 | (Hungary) Falco-Vulcano Szombathely | 6 | 3 | 3 | 472 | 484 | −12 | 9 | Advance to play-ins | 72–82 | — | 78–71 | 67–74 |
| 3 | (Italy) Unahotels Reggio Emilia | 6 | 3 | 3 | 458 | 462 | −4 | 9 | Advance to play-ins | 77–67 | 79–88 | — | 74–70 |
| 4 | (Poland) Śląsk Wrocław | 6 | 1 | 5 | 447 | 494 | −47 | 7 | | 88–98 | 75–84 | 65–73 | — |

Source: Group Standings
Legend: Blue = home team win; Red = away team win.

=== Group G ===
| Pos | Team | Pld | W | L | PF | PA | PD | Pts | Qualification | MAN | DER | CHE | BEN |
|---|---|---|---|---|---|---|---|---|---|---|---|---|---|
| 1 | (Spain) BAXI Manresa | 6 | 5 | 1 | 562 | 465 | +97 | 11 | Advance to round of 16 | — | 100–82 | 105–59 | 92–64 |
| 2 | (Italy) Bertram Derthona Tortona | 6 | 5 | 1 | 497 | 456 | +41 | 11 | Advance to play-ins | 102–85 | — | 87–81 | 77–71 |
| 3 | (Germany) Niners Chemnitz | 6 | 1 | 5 | 450 | 512 | −62 | 7 | Advance to play-ins | 78–89 | 61–77 | — | 103–75 |
| 4 | (Portugal) Benfica | 6 | 1 | 5 | 427 | 503 | −76 | 7 | | 80–91 | 58–72 | 79–68 | — |

Source: Group Standings
Legend: Blue = home team win; Red = away team win.

=== Group H ===
| Pos | Team | Pld | W | L | PF | PA | PD | Pts | Qualification | UCM | MAN | PER | FMP |
|---|---|---|---|---|---|---|---|---|---|---|---|---|---|
| 1 | (Spain) UCAM Murcia | 6 | 5 | 1 | 508 | 455 | +53 | 11 | Advance to round of 16 | — | 97–103 | 83–76 | 86–50 |
| 2 | (Turkey) Manisa Basket | 6 | 4 | 2 | 536 | 523 | +13 | 10 | Advance to play-ins | 72–78 | — | 79–77 | 103–84 |
| 3 | (Greece) Peristeri Domino's | 6 | 2 | 4 | 449 | 457 | −8 | 8 | Advance to play-ins | 76–81 | 90–78 | — | 72–66 |
| 4 | (Serbia) FMP Soccerbet | 6 | 1 | 5 | 445 | 503 | −58 | 7 | | 78–83 | 97–101 | 70–58 | — |

Source: Group Standings
Legend: Blue = home team win; Red = away team win.

== Play-ins ==
The Play-ins will take place from 7 to 22 January 2025. The teams classified in second and third place in their respective groups of Basketball Champions League, went to the Play-ins. The winners will advance to the round of 16. First legs will be played on 7–8 January, second legs on 14–15 January and if required, third legs will be played on 21–22 January.

| Team 1 | Series | Team 2 | Game 1 | Game 2 | Game 3 |
|---|---|---|---|---|---|
| Nanterre 92 (France) | 2–1 | (Belgium) Filou Oostende | 78–88 | 76–67 | 76–71 |
| Karşıyaka Basket (Turkey) | 0–2 | (Greece) Promitheas | 77–81 | 68–84 | — |
| Telekom Baskets Bonn (Germany) | 0–2 | (Italy) Pallacanestro Reggiana | 91–94 | 70–73 | — |
| Bertram Derthona Tortona (Italy) | 2–0 | (Greece) Peristeri Domino's | 69–59 | 73–65 | — |
| Petkim Spor (Turkey) | 2–1 | (Israel) Hapoel Netanel Holon | 82–81 | 62–65 | 93–85 |
| Galatasaray (Turkey) | 2–1 | (France) Saint-Quentin | 84–63 | 79–90 | 75–73 |
| Falco-Vulcano Szombathely (Hungary) | 2–1 | (Israel) Maccabi Ironi Ramat Gan | 88–81 | 69–76 | 106–100 |
| Manisa Basket (Turkey) | 2–0 | (Germany) Niners Chemnitz | 87–86 | 87–84 | — |

== Round of 16 ==
The Round of 16 took place from January 28 until March 26, 2025. The groups was formed by the winners of each Regular Season Group and by eight Play-Ins winners. The 16 teams were divided into four groups of four teams each. The first two of each groups advanced to the quarter-finals.

=== Group I ===
| Pos | Team | Pld | W | L | PF | PA | PD | Pts | Qualification | AEK | DER | WUE | PRO |
|---|---|---|---|---|---|---|---|---|---|---|---|---|---|
| 1 | (Greece) AEK Betsson | 6 | 5 | 1 | 493 | 449 | +44 | 11 | Advance to quarter-finals | — | 93–86 | 84–77 | 97–76 |
| 2 | (Italy) Bertram Derthona Tortona | 6 | 4 | 2 | 507 | 466 | +41 | 10 | Advance to quarter-finals | 83–82 | — | 80–74 | 97–77 |
| 3 | (Germany) FIT/One Würzburg Baskets | 6 | 2 | 4 | 496 | 516 | −20 | 8 | | 71–77 | 80–79 | — | 115–119 |
| 4 | (Greece) Promitheas | 6 | 1 | 5 | 465 | 530 | −65 | 7 | | 56–60 | 60–82 | 77–79 | — |

Source: Round of 16 Standings
Legend: Blue = home team win; Red = away team win.

=== Group J ===
| Pos | Team | Pld | W | L | PF | PA | PD | Pts | Qualification | UNI | GAL | RYT | MAN |
|---|---|---|---|---|---|---|---|---|---|---|---|---|---|
| 1 | (Spain) Unicaja | 6 | 5 | 1 | 550 | 503 | +47 | 11 | Advance to quarter-finals | — | 97–91 | 92–74 | 91–73 |
| 2 | (Turkey) Galatasaray | 6 | 4 | 2 | 532 | 514 | +18 | 10 | Advance to quarter-finals | 86–84 | — | 89–81 | 104–81 |
| 3 | (Lithuania) Rytas | 6 | 2 | 4 | 496 | 502 | −6 | 8 | | 82–83 | 86–66 | — | 98–74 |
| 4 | (Turkey) Manisa Basket | 6 | 1 | 5 | 508 | 567 | −59 | 7 | | 97–103 | 85–96 | 98–75 | — |

Source: Round of 16 Standings
Legend: Blue = home team win; Red = away team win.

=== Group K ===
| Pos | Team | Pld | W | L | PF | PA | PD | Pts | Qualification | TFE | PAL | MAN | PET |
|---|---|---|---|---|---|---|---|---|---|---|---|---|---|
| 1 | (Spain) La Laguna Tenerife | 6 | 6 | 0 | 515 | 450 | +65 | 12 | Advance to quarter-finals | — | 91–69 | 81–71 | 90–83 |
| 2 | (Italy) Unahotels Reggio Emilia | 6 | 3 | 3 | 486 | 498 | −12 | 9 | Advance to quarter-finals | 74–84 | — | 85–70 | 77–70 |
| 3 | (Spain) BAXI Manresa | 6 | 2 | 4 | 492 | 516 | −24 | 8 | | 73–84 | 96–90 | — | 96–87 |
| 4 | (Turkey) Petkim Spor | 6 | 1 | 5 | 496 | 525 | −29 | 7 | | 80–85 | 87–91 | 89–86 | — |

Source: Round of 16 Standings
Legend: Blue = home team win; Red = away team win.

=== Group L ===
| Pos | Team | Pld | W | L | PF | PA | PD | Pts | Qualification | NYM | NAN | UCM | FAL |
|---|---|---|---|---|---|---|---|---|---|---|---|---|---|
| 1 | (Czech Republic) ERA Nymburk | 6 | 5 | 1 | 549 | 451 | +98 | 11 | Advance to quarter-finals | — | 86–90 | 85–70 | 96–68 |
| 2 | (France) Nanterre 92 | 6 | 4 | 2 | 505 | 512 | −7 | 10 | Advance to quarter-finals | 77–100 | — | 76–71 | 83–71 |
| 3 | (Spain) UCAM Murcia | 6 | 3 | 3 | 485 | 474 | +11 | 9 | | 60–76 | 95–84 | — | 85–63 |
| 4 | (Hungary) Falco-Vulcano Szombathely | 6 | 0 | 6 | 467 | 569 | −102 | 6 | | 86–106 | 89–95 | 90–104 | — |

Source: Round of 16 Standings
Legend: Blue = home team win; Red = away team win.

== Playoffs ==
The playoffs began on 8 April 2025 and ends with the 2025 Basketball Champions League Final Four. The 8 qualified clubs have been ranked according to their final position within their respective group during the Round of 16 and their place in the Draw was based on this ranking. The teams having finished 1st of their Round of 16 group was placed in Pot 1, the teams having finished 2nd of their Round of 16 group was placed in Pot 2.

=== Qualified teams ===
Key to colors
| Seeded teams | Unseeded teams |

| Group | Winners | Runners-up |
|---|---|---|
| I | (Greece) AEK Betsson | (Italy) Bertram Derthona Tortona |
| J | (Spain) Unicaja | (Turkey) Galatasaray |
| K | (Spain) La Laguna Tenerife | (Italy) Unahotels Reggio Emilia |
| L | (Czech Republic) ERA Nymburk | (France) Nanterre 92 |

=== Bracket ===
Quarterfinals
9–23 April
(Czech Republic) ERA Nymburk | 80 | 74 | –
(Turkey) Galatasaray | 106 | 90 | –
9–23 April
(Spain) La Laguna Tenerife | 93 | 77 | –
(Italy) Bertram Derthona | 89 | 64 | –
9–23 April
(Greece) AEK Betsson | 76 | 70 | 104
(France) Nanterre 92 | 69 | 82 | 69
9–23 April
(Spain) Unicaja | 105 | 82 | –
(Italy) Unahotels Reggio Emilia | 68 | 72 | –

Semifinals
9 May
(Turkey) Galatasaray | 90
(Spain) La Laguna Tenerife | 80
9 May
(Greece) AEK Betsson | 65
(Spain) Unicaja | 71

Final
11 May
(Turkey) Galatasaray | 67
(Spain) Unicaja | 83
Third place
11 May
(Spain) La Laguna Tenerife | 73
(Greece) AEK Betsson | 77

=== Quarterfinals ===
The quarterfinals was played in a best-of-3 series and started on April 8. The seeded teams played their first (and potential third) game at home, the unseeded teams played their second game at home. Second game was played April 15–16, and thirds on April 23.

| Team 1 | Series | Team 2 | Game 1 | Game 2 | Game 3 |
|---|---|---|---|---|---|
| ERA Nymburk (Czech Republic) | 0–2 | (Turkey) Galatasaray | 80–106 | 74–90 | — |
| La Laguna Tenerife (Spain) | 2–0 | (Italy) Bertram Derthona Tortona | 93–89 | 77–64 | — |
| AEK Betsson (Greece) | 2–1 | (France) Nanterre 92 | 76–69 | 70–82 | 104–69 |
| Unicaja (Spain) | 2–0 | (Italy) Unahotels Reggio Emilia | 105–68 | 82–72 | — |

== Final Four ==
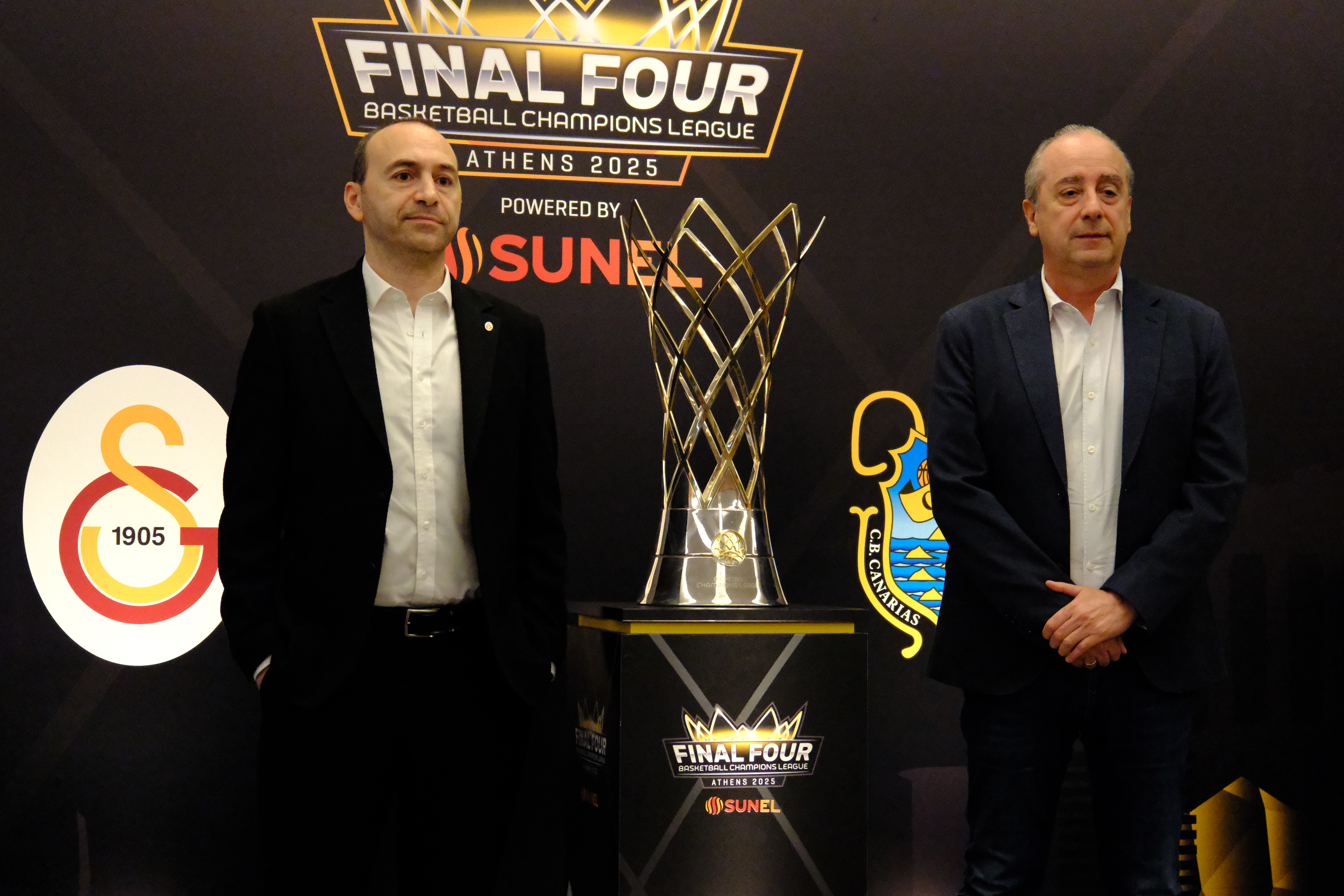
The coaches of Tenerife and Galatasaray in a press conference ahead of the final

=== Semifinals ===
The semifinals were played on 9 May 2025.

| Team 1 | Score | Team 2 |
|---|---|---|
| La Laguna Tenerife (Spain) | 80–90 | (Turkey) Galatasaray |
| AEK Athens (Greece) | 65–71 | (Spain) Unicaja Málaga |

=== Third place game ===
The third place game was played on 11 May 2025.

| Team 1 | Score | Team 2 |
|---|---|---|
| La Laguna Tenerife (Spain) | 73–77 | (Greece) AEK Athens |

=== Final ===
The final was played on 11 May 2025.

| Team 1 | Score | Team 2 |
|---|---|---|
| Galatasaray (Turkey) | 67–83 | (Spain) Unicaja Málaga |

== Individual awards ==
=== Season awards ===
The annual season awards was announced during the Final Four weekend.

| Award | Player | Club |
|---|---|---|
| Most Valuable Player | (Brazil) Marcelo Huertas | (Spain) Lenovo Tenerife |
| Final Four MVP | (United States) Tyson Carter | (Spain) Unicaja |
| Defensive Player of the Year | (Spain) Alberto Díaz | (Spain) Unicaja |
| Best Young Player | (France) Nolan Traoré | (France) Saint-Quentin |
| Best Coach | (Spain) Txus Vidorreta | (Spain) Lenovo Tenerife |

==== Star Lineup ====
| First Team | | Second Team | |
| Player | Team | Player | Team |
|---|---|---|---|
| (Brazil) Marcelinho Huertas | (Spain) Lenovo Tenerife | (United States) Kendrick Perry | (Spain) Unicaja |
| (United States) Hunter Hale | (Greece) AEK Betsson | (United States) Will Cummings | (Turkey) Galatasaray |
| (United States) James Palmer Jr. | (Turkey) Galatasaray | (United States) Desi Rodriguez | (France) Nanterre 92 |
| (United States) Dylan Osetkowski | (Spain) Unicaja | (United States) Derrick Alston Jr. | (Spain) Baxi Manresa |
| (France) Ismaël Kamagate | (Italy) Bertram Derthona Tortona | (United States) Steven Enoch | (Lithuania) Rytas Vilnius |

=== MVP of the Group Phase ===
| Player | Club | Ref. |
|---|---|---|
| (Lithuania) Gytis Radzevičius | (Lithuania) Rytas Vilnius | |

=== Team of the Group Phase ===
| Player | Team | Ref. |
|---|---|---|
| (United States) Errick McCollum | (Turkey) Karşıyaka Basket | |
| (Lithuania) Gytis Radzevičius | (Lithuania) Rytas Vilnius | |
| (United States) Zac Seljaas | (Germany) FIT/One Wurzburg Baskets | |
| (United States) Derrick Alston Jr. | (Spain) BAXI Manresa | |
| (France) Ismaël Kamagate | (Italy) Bertram Derthona Tortona | |

=== MVP of the Play-Ins ===
| Player | Club | Ref. |
|---|---|---|
| (United States) Will Cummings | (Turkey) Galatasaray | |

=== Team of the Play-Ins ===
| Player | Team | Ref. |
|---|---|---|
| (United States) Cassius Winston | (Italy) Pallacanestro Reggiana | |
| (United States) Will Cummings | (Turkey) Galatasaray | |
| (France) Hugo Besson | (Turkey) Manisa Basket | |
| (United States) Matt Tiby | (Hungary) Falco-Vulcano Szombathely | |
| (Colombia) Jaime Echenique | (Turkey) Petkim Spor | |

=== MVP of the Round of 16 ===
| Player | Club | Ref. |
|---|---|---|
| (United States) James Palmer | (Turkey) Galatasaray | |

=== Team of the Round of 16 ===
| Player | Team | Ref. |
|---|---|---|
| (Brazil) Marcelo Huertas | (Spain) La Laguna Tenerife | |
| (United States) Tyson Carter | (Spain) Unicaja | |
| (United States) James Palmer | (Turkey) Galatasaray | |
| (United States) Desi Rodriguez | (France) Nanterre 92 | |
| (United States) Grant Golden | (Greece) AEK Betsson | |

=== MVP of the Quarter-Finals ===
| Player | Club | Ref. |
|---|---|---|
| (Brazil) Marcelo Huertas | (Spain) La Laguna Tenerife | |

=== Team of the Quarter-Finals ===
| Player | Team | Ref. |
|---|---|---|
| (Brazil) Marcelo Huertas | (Spain) La Laguna Tenerife | |
| (United States) Hunter Hale | (Greece) AEK Betsson | |
| (United States) Will Cummings | (Turkey) Galatasaray | |
| (United States) Tyson Carter | (Spain) Unicaja | |
| (Georgian Basketball Federation) Giorgi Shermadini | (Spain) La Laguna Tenerife | |

== See also ==
- 2024–25 EuroLeague
- 2024–25 EuroCup Basketball
- 2024–25 FIBA Europe Cup
