= Tyson Pérez =

Spanish basketball player (born 1996)

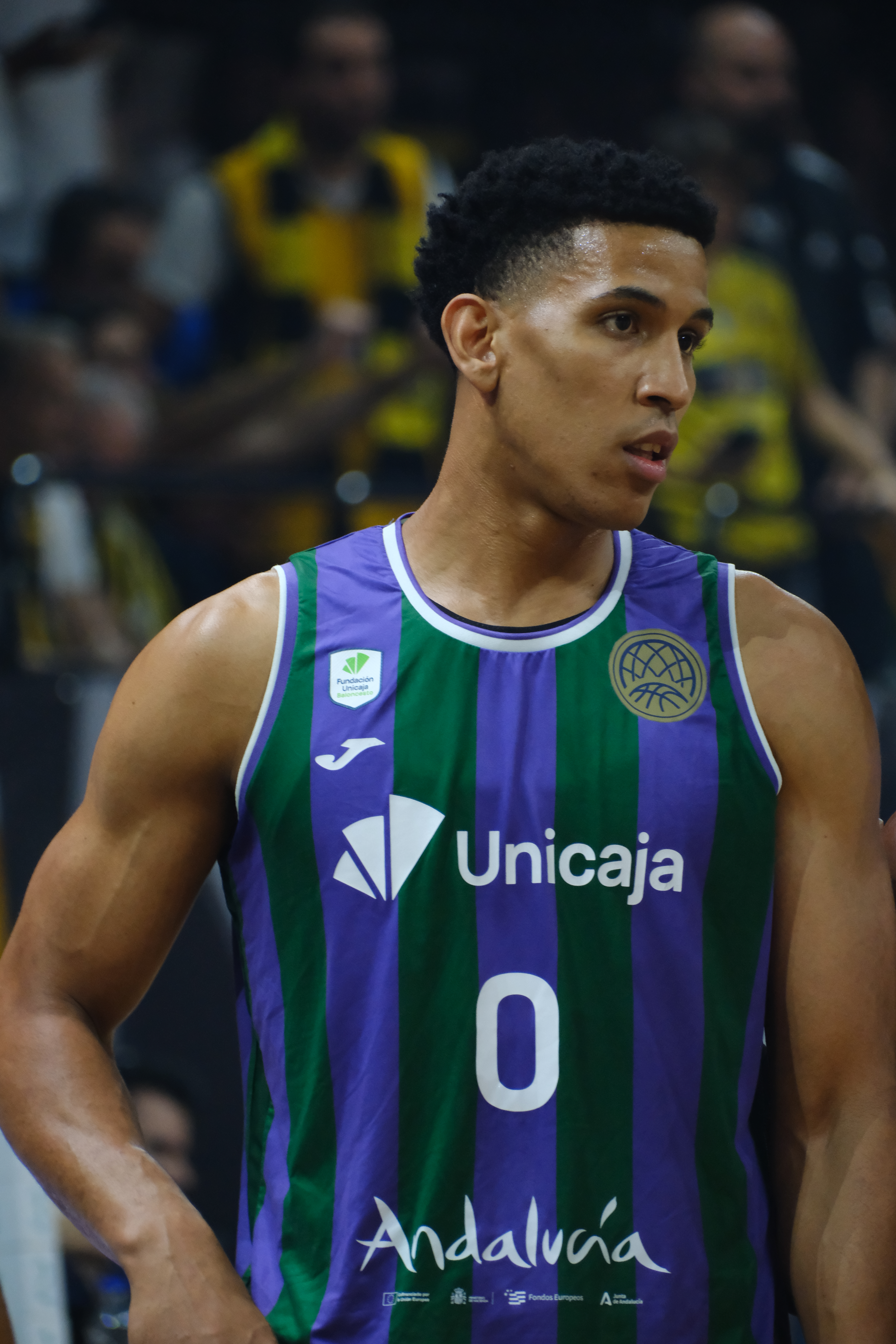
- Pérez with Málaga

No. 0 – Unicaja Málaga
- Position: Power forward
- League: Liga ACB

Personal information
- Born: 29 January 1996 (age 30) Santo Domingo, Dominican Republic
- Listed height: 6 ft 8 in (2.03 m)
- Listed weight: 213 lb (97 kg)

Career information
- Playing career: 2014–present

Career history
- 2014–2016: Santo Domingo Betanzos
- 2016–2017: Eurocolegio Casvi
- 2017–2019: Real Canoe
- 2019–2023: BC Andorra
- 2022: →Baxi Manresa
- 2023: →Real Betis
- 2023–present: Unicaja Málaga
- 2023–2024: →Morabanc Andorra

Career highlights
- LEB Oro champion (2019); Lliga Catalana champion (2020); 2× Basketball Champions League champion (2024, 2025); 2× FIBA Intercontinental Cup champion (2024, 2025); LEB Plata MVP (2018); LEB Oro MVP (2019)

José Miguel "Tyson" Pérez Balbuena (born 29 January 1996) is a professional basketball player for Unicaja Málaga of the Liga ACB. Standing at 2.02m tall, he plays as a power forward. Born in the Dominican Republic, he has been a full international for Spain since November 2020.

The nickname "Tyson" was received from his father (with whom he played a lot of boxing as a child) and which ends up spreading so much that everyone ends up knowing him by it.

== Professional career ==
Pérez made his debut in the Liga EBA in 2014, in the ranks of Santo Domingo Betanzos, but did not stand out until the 2016–17 season, where he had a good season in the ranks of Eurocolegio Casvi, which led him to sign for Real Canoe, a team that was recently promoted to the LEB Plata, in 2017.

In the 2017–18 season, Pérez became one of the key pieces of the Madrid team, which managed to be promoted. That summer he renewed his contract with Canoe for one season, thus debuting in the LEB Oro and managing to be named MVP of the season.

After his time with the Madrid team, Pérez made the jump to the Liga ACB, signing in July 2019 for BC Andorra, a team with which, after a great first campaign, he renewed his contract with until June 2023.

On 16 May 2021, Pérez suffered a serious injury to his left knee (anterior cruciate ligament tear), but despite this, the club renewed his contract until 2024. He was unable to play in the entire following season and, once recovered, he was loaned first to Baxi Manresa (August 2022), and later to Real Betis Baloncesto (January 2023), where he recovered his level, to the point of being chosen as the best player of the 26th round of the Liga Endesa.

At the beginning of the 2023–24 season, Pérez returned to the team that owns his rights, Morabanc Andorra. After only four games played, Unicaja announced they signed him until 2027, although he would continue until the end of the season with the Andorran team on loan.

In the final of the 2025 Basketball Champions League Final Four tournament, Pérez stood as his team’s top rebounder (11), helping Unicaja to its second consecutive title in the competition.

== National team career ==
Pérez made his debut with the Spanish national team in a match against Israel, in November 2020 during EuroBasket 2022 qualification.
