= 2025 Basketball Champions League Final Four =

Concluding tournament

2025 Basketball Champions League Final Four powered by SUNEL
- Season: 2024–25 season

Tournament details
- Arena: SUNEL Arena; Athens, Greece
- Dates: 9–11 May

Final positions
- Champions: (Spain) Unicaja (2nd title)
- Runners-up: (Turkey) Galatasaray
- Third place: (Greece) AEK Athens Bettson
- Fourth place: (Spain) La Laguna Tenerife

Awards and statistics
- MVP: Tyson Carter (Unicaja)

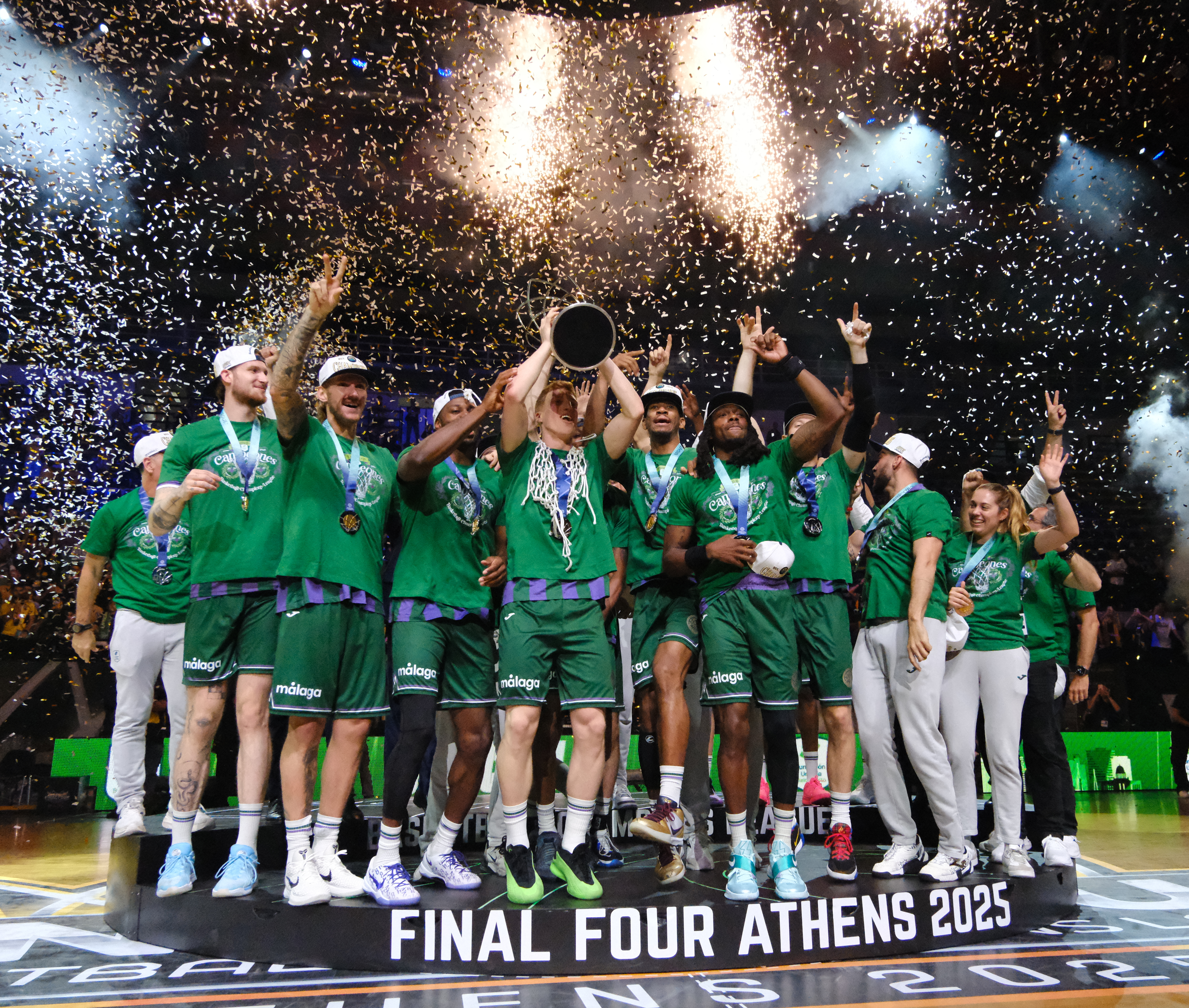
Unicaja Malaga 2024-25 Basketball Champions League championship ceremony

The 2025 Basketball Champions League Final Four powered by SUNEL, also known as the 2025 BCL Final Four, is the concluding tournament of the 2024–25 Basketball Champions League. The tournament is hosted at the SUNEL Arena in Athens, Greece.

== Venue and Sponsorship ==
The 2025 Basketball Champions League Final Four will be hosted in Athens for the third time after 2018 and 2020, but will be the first one at the SUNEL Arena.

Athens	2025 Basketball Champions League Final Four (Europe)
SUNEL Arena	2025 Basketball Champions League Final Four (Europe)
Capacity: 9,025	2025 Basketball Champions League Final Four (Europe)

=== Sponsorship ===
The sportsbook and casino company Betsson and solar energy company SUNEL became key sponsors of the BCL Final Four in collaboration with FIBA and the Basketball Champions League after AEK Betsson BC, which both companies sponsor, qualified for the tournament.

== Teams ==
=== Road to the Final Four ===
Club	Clinched Final Four	Previous final tournament appearances	Season performance						
Club	Clinched Final Four	Previous final tournament appearances	Regular season record	Round of 16	Quarterfinals				
(Turkey) Galatasaray	15 April 2025	0 (debut)	4–2 (2nd Group D)	4–2 (2nd Group J)	(Czech Republic) ERA Nymburk	2–0	80–106 (A)	90–74 (H)	
(Spain) Unicaja	15 April 2025	2 (2023, 2024)	6–0 (1st Group B)	5–1 (1st Group J)	(Italy) Unahotels Reggio Emilia	2–0	105–68 (H)	72–82 (A)	
(Spain) La Laguna Tenerife	16 April 2025	7 (2017, 2019, 2020, 2021, 2022, 2023, 2024)	6–0 (1st Group C)	6–0 (1st Group K)	(Italy) Bertram Derthona	2–0	93–89 (H)	64–74 (A)	
(Greece) AEK Athens	23 April 2025	2 (2018, 2020)	4–2 (1st Group E)	5–1 (1st Group I)	(France) Nanterre 92	2–1	76–69 (H)	82–70 (A)	104–69 (H)

== Bracket ==
Semifinals
9 May
(Spain) La Laguna Tenerife	80
(Turkey) Galatasaray	90
9 May
(Greece) AEK Betsson BC	65
(Spain) Unicaja	71

Final
11 May
(Turkey) Galatasaray	67
(Spain) Unicaja	83
Third place game
11 May
(Spain) La Laguna Tenerife	73
(Greece) AEK Betsson BC	77

== Semifinals ==
2025 Final Four semifinals were played on May 9, 2025, at the SUNEL Arena in Athens, Greece.

9 May 2025	La Laguna Tenerife (Spain)	80–90	(Turkey) Galatasaray	Athens
18:00	Scoring by quarter: 24–20, 19–20, 12–24, 25–26
	Pts: Huertas 18; Rebs: Scrubb 5 Asts: Fitipaldo 6 PIR: Shermadini 17	Boxscore	Pts: Cummings, Izundu 21; Rebs: Izundu 10; Asts: three players 3 PIR: Izundu 28	Arena: SUNEL Arena; Attendance: 7,211; Referees: Ademir Zurapovic (BIH), Yohan Rosso (FRA), Gvidas Gedvilas (LTU)

9 May 2025	AEK Betsson BC (Greece)	65–71	(Spain) Unicaja	Athens
21:00	Scoring by quarter: 20–23, 11–14, 24–13, 10–21
	Pts: Golden 19; Rebs: Bryce 7 Asts: Golden 5 PIR: Golden 23	Boxscore	Pts: Osetkowski 14; Rebs: Osetkowski 10; Asts: Kalinoski, Taylor 3 PIR: Osetkowski 16	Arena: SUNEL Arena; Attendance: 8,291; Referees: Wojciech Liszka (POL), Boris Krejić (SLO), Julio Anaya (PAN)

== Third place game ==
11 May 2025	La Laguna Tenerife (Spain)	73–77	(Greece) AEK Betsson BC	Athens
17:00	Scoring by quarter: 21–11, 18–17, 16–18, 18–31
	Pts: Krämer 15; Rebs: Shermadini 13; Asts: Huertas 3 PIR: Krämer 15	Boxscore	Pts: Tucker 20; Rebs: Golden 7 Asts: Gray 4 PIR: Tucker 19	Arena: SUNEL Arena; Attendance: 8,291; Referees: Yohan Rosso (FRA), Mārtiņš Kozlovskis (LAT), Gatis Salins (LAT)

== Final ==
The 2025 Basketball Champions League Final was contested at the SUNEL Arena in Athens on May 11, 2025, at 20:00 local time.

11 May 2025	Galatasaray (Turkey)	67–83	(Spain) Unicaja	Athens
20:00	Scoring by quarter: 13–19, 18–18, 18–19, 18–27
	Pts: Cummings, Wallace 14; Rebs: Izundu 11; Asts: Palmer 4 PIR: Wallace 16	Boxscore	Pts: Carter 14; Rebs: Pérez 11; Asts: Carter 5 PIR: Pérez 18	Arena: SUNEL Arena; Attendance: 7,212; Referees: Wojciech Liszka (POL), Boris Krejić (SLO), Julio Anaya (PAN)
