= Baloncesto Málaga =

Unicaja
- Leagues: Liga ACB; Champions League
- Founded: 1977; 49 years ago
- History: Caja de Ronda (1977–1992); Unicaja Mayoral (1992–1993); Unicaja Polti (1993–1994); Unicaja (1994–present)
- Arena: Martín Carpena
- Capacity: 10,699
- Location: Málaga, Spain
- Team colors: Forest green, white, purple and lime
- President: Antonio López Nieto
- Head coach: Txus Vidorreta
- Team captain: Alberto Díaz
- Ownership: Unicaja
- Championships: 2 Intercontinental Cup; 2 Champions League; 1 EuroCup; 1 Korać Cup; 1 Spanish Championship; 3 Spanish Cup; 1 Spanish Supercup
- Retired numbers: 1 (5)
- Website: unicajabaloncesto.com
Home	Away	Third

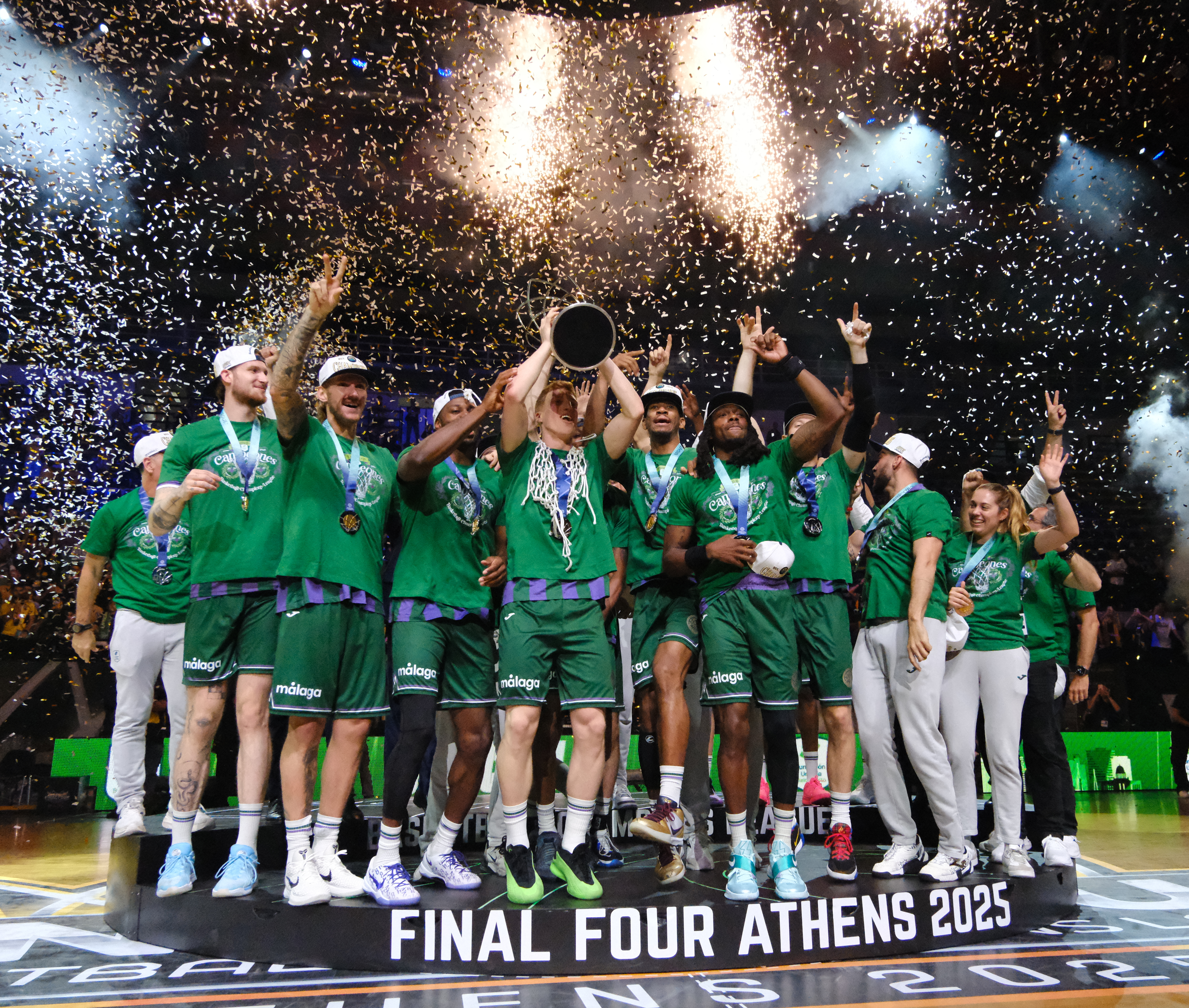
Unicaja 2024–25 Basketball Champions League championship ceremony

Baloncesto Málaga S.A.D., also known as Unicaja for sponsorship reasons, is a professional basketball club based in Málaga, Spain. The team plays in the Liga ACB and the Champions League. Founded in 1977, the team is sponsored by the Spanish bank Unicaja and has carried that sponsorship name since 1992. They play their home games at the Palacio de Deportes José María Martín Carpena, shortly known as the "Martín Carpena". Unicaja has won one Liga ACB title, in 2006, as well as three Copas del Rey, one EuroCup, two Basketball Champions League, one FIBA Korać Cup and two FIBA Intercontinental Cup titles.

== History ==
Unicaja was originally founded in 1977, as CB Caja de Ronda. In 1992, the club merged another ACB team in the city of Málaga, CB Maristas de Málaga, which was originally founded in 1953 as Ademar Basket Club. Over the years, the club has featured players like: Nacho Rodríguez, Berni Rodríguez, Carlos Cabezas, Jorge Garbajosa, Marcus Brown, Sergei Babkov, Michael Ansley, Louis Bullock, and Kenny Miller, as well as numerous other well-known players. The club won its first title, when it won the European-wide third tier level FIBA Korać Cup in the 2000–01 season. They then won the Spanish King's Cup title in 2005. The next year, in the 2005–06 season, Unicaja won its first-ever Spanish League championship.

The club finished its best years to date, by qualifying for the 2007 Euroleague Final Four, where it was defeated in the semifinals by CSKA Moscow, and thus finished in third place in the EuroLeague. In October 2007, Unicaja faced the NBA's Memphis Grizzlies in a friendly match, and they defeated the Grizzlies, by a score of 102–99. That was one of the 17 times that an NBA team has lost to a foreign club. Pau Gasol and Juan Carlos Navarro, two of the greatest Spanish basketball players of all time, played for Memphis in that historical game.

Unicaja participated in the European-wide top-tier level league, the EuroLeague, for 15 consecutive seasons (2001–02 season to 2015–16 season). However, in the summer of 2015, it lost its EuroLeague A-licence. Therefore, in the 2016–17 season, Unicaja participated in the second tier level EuroCup. The club immediately won the EuroCup title, in its first season in the league, after winning over Valencia Basket in the league's Finals.

From 2001–02 to 2020–21 seasons, the team competes in Euroleague Basketball competitions, until they switched to FIBA's Basketball Champions League since the 2021–22 season. In the 2023–24 season, Uncaja won the championship after defeating Canarias in the final, which took place in Belgrade. As European champions, Unicaja then played in the 2024 FIBA Intercontinental Cup in Singapore, and won its first world-level title.

In the following 2024–25 season, Unicaja once again won the BCL championship, after defeating Galatasaray in the final of the Final Four in Athens. They became the second team to win consecutive league titles, following San Pablo Burgos.

== Logos ==
Logo of the club since 2024.

Former logo of the club.

== Home arenas ==
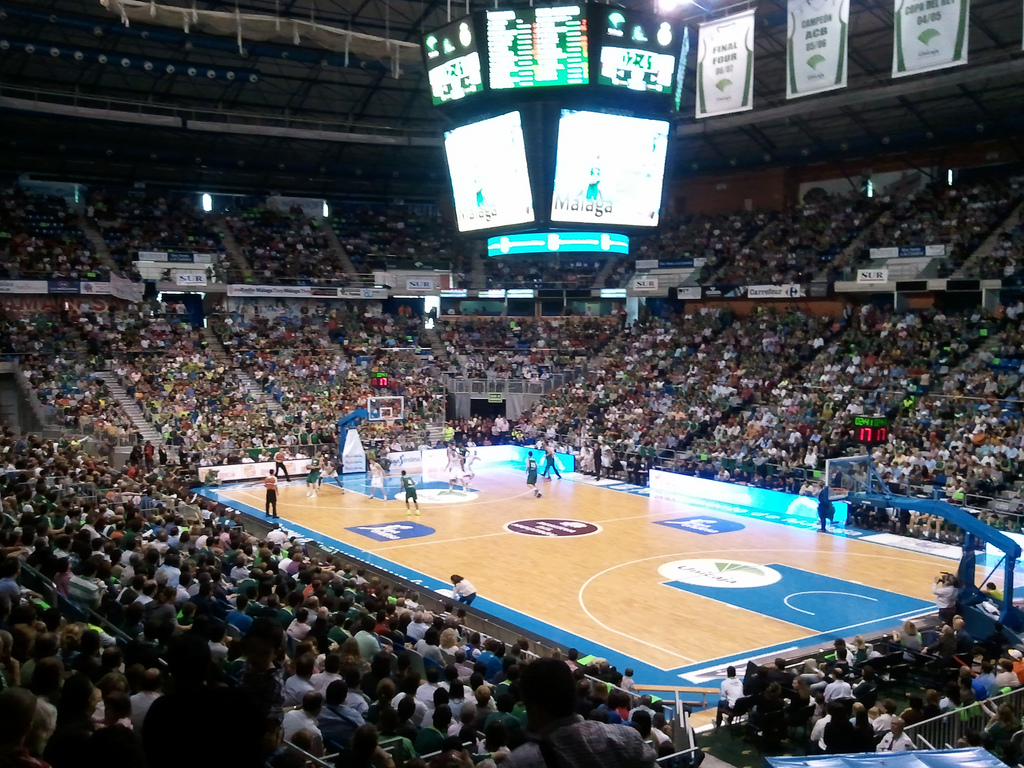
ACB 2011–12 game between Unicaja and Real Madrid, at Martín Carpena.

- Pabellón Guadaljaire (1977–78)
- Pabellón Tiro Pichón (1978–81)
- Pabellón Ciudad Jardín (1981–99)
- Palacio de Deportes José María Martín Carpena (1999–present)

Since 1999, Unicaja has played its home games at the Palacio de Deportes José María Martín Carpena arena. The arena originally seated 9,743 spectators for basketball games, and was expanded in the year 2010, to a current seating capacity of 11,300 people for basketball games.

== Players ==
=== Retired numbers ===
Unicaja retired numbers
No	Nat.	Player	Position	Tenure	Ceremony date
5	(Spain)	Berni Rodríguez	SG	1998–2012	26 June 2012; 21 May 2017

=== Current roster ===
Note: Flags indicate national team eligibility at FIBA-sanctioned events. Players may hold other non-FIBA nationalities not displayed.

Unicaja Málaga roster
Players
Coaches

Pos.	No.	Nat.	Name	Ht.	Wt.	Age
PF	0	(Spain)	Pérez, Tyson	2.02 m (6 ft 8 in)	97 kg (214 lb)	30 – 29 January 1996
C	3	(Democratic Republic of the Congo)	Nzosa, Yannick	2.08 m (6 ft 10 in)	88 kg (194 lb)	23 – 15 November 2003
SG	4	(United States)	Kalinoski, Tyler	1.93 m (6 ft 4 in)	82 kg (181 lb)	33 – 19 December 1992
SF	7	(Spain)	Barreiro, Jonathan	2.03 m (6 ft 8 in)	103 kg (227 lb)	29 – 16 January 1997
SF	8	(Lithuania)	Brazdeikis, Ignas	2.01 m (6 ft 7 in)	100 kg (220 lb)	27 – 8 January 1999
PG	9	(Spain)	Díaz, Alberto (C)	1.90 m (6 ft 3 in)	86 kg (190 lb)	32 – 23 April 1994
F	11	(United States)	Knox II, Kevin	2.03 m (6 ft 8 in)	98 kg (216 lb)	27 – 11 August 1999
SF	13	(Germany)	Lukošius, Simonas	1.99 m (6 ft 6 in)	102 kg (225 lb)	24 – 13 August 2002
G/F	14	(Bosnia and Herzegovina)	Đedović, Nihad	1.97 m (6 ft 6 in)	90 kg (198 lb)	36 – 12 January 1990
PF	17	(France)	Noua, Amine	2.02 m (6 ft 8 in)	91 kg (201 lb)	29 – 7 February 1997
PG	19	(Sweden)	Pantzar, Melwin	1.90 m (6 ft 3 in)	86 kg (190 lb)	26 – 10 April 2000
SG	21	(United States)	Thomas, Matt	1.91 m (6 ft 3 in)	86 kg (190 lb)	32 – 4 August 1994
SG	24	(United States)	Hunt, Cameron	1.91 m (6 ft 3 in)	79 kg (174 lb)	29 – 25 August 1997
F/C	33	(France)	Tillie, Killian	2.08 m (6 ft 10 in)	100 kg (220 lb)	28 – 5 March 1998
C	41	(Spain)	Hernangómez, Willy	2.10 m (6 ft 11 in)	113 kg (249 lb)	32 – 27 May 1994
C	45	(Bulgaria)	Kravish, David	2.08 m (6 ft 10 in)	109 kg (240 lb)	34 – 12 September 1992
PG	55	(Montenegro)	Perry, Kendrick	1.83 m (6 ft 0 in)	82 kg (181 lb)	33 – 23 December 1992

Head coach

- (Spanish Basketball Federation) Txus Vidorreta

Assistant coach(es)

- (Spanish Basketball Federation) Gonzalo Hermoso

Legend

- (C) Team captain
- Injured

- Roster
- Transactions
Updated: October 26, 2026

=== Depth chart ===
Pos.	Starting 5	Bench 1	Bench 2	Bench 3
C	Willy Hernangómez †	David Kravish		Yannick Nzosa †
PF	Kevin Knox II *	Amine Noua	Jonathan Barreiro †	Tyson Pérez † (injured)
SF	Ignas Brazdeikis	Simonas Lukošius
SG	Matt Thomas *	Tyler Kalinoski	Nihad Đedović †	Cameron Hunt *
PG	Kendrick Perry	Melwin Pantzar †		Alberto Díaz † (injured)

Notes: Blue † – homegrown player; (Note: A homegrown player is a player that played for at least three years before the age of 20 on a Spanish team. In Liga ACB, the team must register at least four homegrown players in rosters of 10–12 players or at least three homegrown players in rosters of 8–9 players. In Champions League, the team must register at least five homegrown players in rosters of 11–12 players or at least four homegrown players in rosters of 10 players.) Red * – overseas player; (Note: An overseas player is a player from outside EEA, FIBA Europe or ACP states. In Liga ACB, the team may register at most two overseas players. In Champions League, the team did not have any limitations regarding the number of overseas players.) Green ‡ – youth player (Note: In Liga ACB, the team may register under-22 players linked to the youth system.)

=== Notable players ===
Note: Flags indicate national team eligibility at FIBA-sanctioned events. Players may hold other non-FIBA nationalities not displayed.

Criteria

To appear in this section a player must have either:

- Set a club record or won an individual award while at the club
- Played at least one official international match for their national team at any time
- Played at least one official NBA match at any time.

Spain

- (Spain) Álex Abrines
- (Spain) Jonathan Barreiro
- (Spain) Saúl Blanco
- (Spain) Darío Brizuela
- (Spain) Carlos Cabezas
- (Spain) Iñaki De Miguel
- (Spain) Alberto Díaz
- (Spain) Dani Díez
- (Spain) Jaime Fernández
- (Spain) Xavi Fernández
- (Spain) Germán Gabriel
- (Spain) Jorge Garbajosa
- (Spain) Ricardo Guillén
- (Spain) Carlos Jiménez
- (Spain) Tomás Jofresa
- (Spain) Chuck Kornegay
- (Spain) Pablo Laso
- (Spain) Juan Antonio Orenga
- (Spain) Alfonso Reyes
- (Spain) Berni Rodríguez
- (Spain) Ignacio Rodríguez
- (Spain) Mario Saint-Supéry
- (Spain) Yankuba Sima
- (Spain) Mike Smith
- (Spain) Carlos Suárez
- (Spain) Fran Vázquez
- (Spain) Paco Vázquez
- (Spain) Sergi Vidal

Europe

- (Belgium) Marcus Faison
- (Belgium) Jean-Marc Jaumin
- (Bosnia and Herzegovina) JR Bremer
- (Bosnia and Herzegovina) Nihad Đedović
- (Bosnia and Herzegovina) Kendrick Perry
- (Bosnia and Herzegovina) Nedžad Sinanović
- (Bulgaria) Roderick Blakney
- (Bulgaria) Earl Calloway
- (Bulgaria) David Kravish
- (Bulgaria) Earl Rowland
- (Croatia) Davor Kus
- (Croatia) Oliver Lafayette
- (Croatia) Veljko Mršić
- (Croatia) Sandro Nicević
- (Croatia) Hrvoje Perić
- (Croatia) Krunoslav Simon
- (Croatia) Zan Tabak
- (Croatia) Luka Žorić
- (Czech Republic) Jiri Welsch
- (Finland) Sasu Salin
- (France) Joseph Gomis
- (France) Edwin Jackson
- (France) Mathias Lessort
- (France) Florent Pietrus
- (France) Stéphane Risacher
- (France) Moustapha Sonko
- (France) Frédéric Weis
- (Georgia (country)) Giorgi Shermadini
- (Georgia (country)) Shammond Williams
- (Germany) Ademola Okulaja
- (Germany) Dylan Osetkowski
- (United Kingdom) Robert Archibald
- (United Kingdom) Joel Freeland
- (United Kingdom) Darren Phillip
- (Greece) Ioannis Giannoulis
- (Greece) Georgios Printezis
- (Greece) Kostas Vasileiadis
- (Iceland) Pavel Ermolinskij
- (Iceland) Jon Stefansson
- (Israel) Gal Mekel
- (Italy) Jeff Brooks
- (Latvia) Kaspars Berzins
- (Latvia) Kristaps Valters
- (Lithuania) Gintaras Einikis
- (Lithuania) Mindaugas Kuzminskas
- (Lithuania) Domantas Sabonis
- (North Macedonia) Richard Hendrix
- (Montenegro) Omar Cook
- (Montenegro) Vladimir Golubović
- (Montenegro) Kendrick Perry
- (Poland) Aleksander Balcerowski
- (Poland) Michał Chyliński
- (Poland) Thomas Kelati
- (Poland) Adam Waczyński
- (Poland) Adam Wójcik
- (Serbia) Milan Gurović
- (Serbia) Stefan Marković
- (Serbia) Dragan Milosavljević
- (Serbia) Dejan Musli
- (Serbia) Nemanja Nedović
- (Serbia) Kosta Perović
- (Serbia) Bojan Popović
- (Serbia) Vladimir Štimac
- (Serbia) Uroš Tripković
- (Slovenia) Zoran Dragić
- (Slovenia) Erazem Lorbek
- (Slovenia) Alen Omić
- (Slovenia) Marko Tusek
- (Slovakia) Richard Petruska
- (Russia) Sergei Babkov
- (Russia) Valeri Tikhonenko
- (Ukraine) Volodymyr Gerun
- (Ukraine) Eugene Jeter

USA

- (United States) Tim Abromaitis
- (United States) Josh Adams
- (United States) Joe Arlauckas
- (United States) Victor Alexander
- (United States) James Augustine
- (United States) Mario Bennett
- (United States) Adrian Branch
- (United States) Marcus Brown
- (United States) Louis Bullock
- (United States) Tyson Carter
- (United States) Norris Cole
- (United States) Jack Cooley
- (United States) Juan Dixon
- (United States) Zabian Dowdell
- (United States) Jamie Feick
- (United States) Gerald Fitch
- (United States) Kyle Fogg
- (United States) Marcus Haislip
- (United States) Marc Iavaroni
- (United States) Tyler Kalinoski
- (United States) Tarence Kinsey
- (United States) Tony Massenburg
- (United States) Ray McCallum Jr.
- (United States) Kenny Miller
- (United States) Gary Neal
- (United States) DeMarcus Nelson
- (United States) Cameron Oliver
- (United States) Andy Panko
- (United States) Brian Roberts
- (United States) Lou Roe
- (United States) Sean Rooks
- (United States) Ralph Sampson
- (United States) Paul Shirley
- (United States) Reggie Slater
- (United States) Kameron Taylor
- (United States) Ray Tolbert
- (United States) Marcus Williams
- (United States) David Wood

Rest of Americas

- (Argentina) Juan Ignacio Sánchez
- (Argentina) Walter Herrmann
- (Brazil) Vítor Faverani
- (Brazil) Rafael Hettsheimeir
- (Brazil) Augusto Lima
- (Brazil) Rafa Luz
- (Brazil) Paulo Prestes
- (Canada) Melvin Ejim
- (Canada) Kyle Wiltjer
- (Dominican Republic) Juan José García
- (Puerto Rico) José Ortiz
- (Puerto Rico) Daniel Santiago
- (Uruguay) Panchi Barrera
- (Uruguay) Jayson Granger

Africa

- (Angola) Jean-Jacques Conceição
- (Democratic Republic of the Congo) Christian Eyenga
- (Senegal) Hamady Ndiaye
- (Senegal) Boniface Ndong

== Head coaches ==
- Alfonso Queipo de Llano: 1977–79, 1985–86
- José María Martín Urbano : 1979–80, 1982, 1985, 1987, 1990–92
- Damián Caneda: 1980–81
- Ramón Guardiola: 1981–82
- Moncho Monsalve: 1982–84
- Ignacio Pinedo: 1984–85
- Arturo Ortega: 1986–87
- Zoran Slavnić: 1987–88
- Mario Pesquera: 1988–90
- Javier Imbroda: 1992–98
- Pedro Ramírez: 1998–99
- Božidar Maljković: 1999–03
- Paco Alonso: 2003
- Chechu Mulero: 2003
- Sergio Scariolo: 2003–08
- Aito Garcia Reneses: 2008–2011
- Chus Mateo: 2011–12
- Luis Casimiro: 2012
- Jasmin Repeša: 2012–13
- Joan Plaza: 2013–2018
- Luis Casimiro: 2018–2021
- Fotios Katsikaris: 2021–2022
- Ibon Navarro: 2022–2026
- Txus Vidorreta: 2026–present

== Season by season ==
=== Caja de Ronda ===
Season	Tier	Division	Pos.	W–L	Copa del Rey	Other cups		European competitions		
1978–79	2	1ª División B	10th	6–16						
1979–80	2	1ª División B	9th	13–17						
1980–81	2	1ª División B	1st	19–2–5						
1981–82	1	1ª División	10th	10–1–15	Round of 16					
1982–83	1	1ª División	12th	6–20	Quarterfinalist					
1983–84	1	Liga ACB	10th	14–16						
1984–85	1	Liga ACB	14th	13–19						
1985–86	2	1ª División B	4th	18–15						
1986–87	2	1ª División B	1st	24–10						
1987–88	1	Liga ACB	14th	3–30		Copa Príncipe	R16			
1988–89	1	Liga ACB	5th	23–15	Quarterfinalist					
1989–90	1	Liga ACB	5th	21–17	Round of 16			3 Korać Cup	R1	1–1
1990–91	1	Liga ACB	10th	19–21	Third round			3 Korać Cup	R1	0–2
1991–92	1	Liga ACB	14th	16–23	Second round					

=== CB Maristas ===
Season	Tier	Division	Pos.	W–L	Copa del Rey
1981–82	3	2ª División	1st		
1982–83	3	2ª División	2nd		
1983–84	3	2ª División	2nd		
1984–85	2	1ª División B	16th	6–20	
1985–86	3	2ª División	2nd		
1986–87	2	1ª División B	18th	12–22	
1987–88	2	1ª División B	4th	32–13	
1988–89	1	Liga ACB	15th	22–17	First round
1989–90	1	Liga ACB	13th	18–22	Round of 16
1990–91	1	Liga ACB	14th	18–22	Second round
1991–92	1	Liga ACB	15th	15–22	First round

=== Unicaja ===
Season	Tier	Division	Pos.	W–L	Copa del Rey	Other cups		European competitions		
1992–93	1	Liga ACB	6th	19–14	First round					
1993–94	1	Liga ACB	12th	13–18	Quarterfinalist					
1994–95	1	Liga ACB	2nd	32–16	First round					
1995–96	1	Liga ACB	6th	27–14	Quarterfinalist			1 European League	GS	8–8
1996–97	1	Liga ACB	7th	22–17				3 Korać Cup	QF	9–3
1997–98	1	Liga ACB	8th	20–17				3 Korać Cup	R16	7–3
1998–99	1	Liga ACB	9th	18–16	Quarterfinalist			3 Korać Cup	GS	2–4
1999–00	1	Liga ACB	8th	22–17	Quarterfinalist			3 Korać Cup	RU	11–5
2000–01	1	Liga ACB	4th	30–11	Quarterfinalist			3 Korać Cup	C	14–2
2001–02	1	Liga ACB	2nd	33–10	Semifinalist			1 Euroleague	RS	6–8
2002–03	1	Liga ACB	3rd	29–15	Semifinalist			1 Euroleague	T16	8–12
2003–04	1	Liga ACB	4th	23–19				1 Euroleague	RS	4–10
2004–05	1	Liga ACB	3rd	27–16	Champion	Supercopa	3rd	1 Euroleague	RS	6–8
2005–06	1	Liga ACB	1st	35–10	Semifinalist	Supercopa	4th	1 Euroleague	T16	15–5
2006–07	1	Liga ACB	8th	17–20	Quarterfinalist	Supercopa	RU	1 Euroleague	3rd	14–11
2007–08	1	Liga ACB	4th	19–19	Quarterfinalist			1 Euroleague	T16	13–7
2008–09	1	Liga ACB	3rd	27–11	Runner-up			1 Euroleague	T16	10–6
2009–10	1	Liga ACB	4th	21–18				1 Euroleague	T16	9–7
2010–11	1	Liga ACB	8th	19–17				1 Euroleague	T16	6–10
2011–12	1	Liga ACB	9th	17–17	Quarterfinalist			1 Euroleague	T16	4–12
2012–13	1	Liga ACB	9th	18–16				1 Euroleague	T16	15–9
2013–14	1	Liga ACB	4th	26–15	Quarterfinalist			1 Euroleague	T16	11–13
2014–15	1	Liga ACB	3rd	29–13	Semifinalist			1 Euroleague	T16	8–16
2015–16	1	Liga ACB	6th	20–16		Supercopa	RU	1 Euroleague	T16	11–13
2016–17	1	Liga ACB	4th	24–14	Quarterfinalist			2 EuroCup	C	13–9
2017–18	1	Liga ACB	7th	19–17	Quarterfinalist	Supercopa	SF	1 EuroLeague	9th	13–17
2018–19	1	Liga ACB	6th	22-15	Quarterfinalist			2 EuroCup	QF	12–7
2019–20	1	Liga ACB	10th	15–13	Runner-up			2 EuroCup	—	11–5
2020–21	1	Liga ACB	11th	17–19	Quarterfinalist			2 EuroCup	T16	8–8
2021–22	1	Liga ACB	12th	13–21				3 Champions League	QF	6–6
2022–23	1	Liga ACB	3rd	27–13	Champion			3 Champions League	4th	14–4
2023–24	1	Liga ACB	3rd	32–9	Quarterfinalist	Supercopa	RU	3 Champions League	C	14–2
2024–25	1	Liga ACB	4th	26–14	Champion	Intercontinental Cup	C	3 Champions League	C	15–1
2024–25	1	Liga ACB	4th	26–14	Champion	Supercopa	C	3 Champions League	C	15–1
2025–26	1	Liga ACB	9th	17–17	Quarterfinalist	Intercontinental Cup	C	3 Champions League	3rd	13–3
2025–26	1	Liga ACB	9th	17–17	Quarterfinalist	Supercopa	SF	3 Champions League	3rd	13–3

== Honours and other achievements ==
Honours
Type	Competition	Titles	Seasons
International	EuroCup	1	2016–17
International	FIBA Korać Cup	1	2000–01
International	FIBA Champions League	2	2023–24, 2024–25
International	FIBA Intercontinental Cup	2	2024, 2025
Domestic	Spanish League	1	2005–06
Domestic	Spanish Cup	3	2005, 2023, 2025
Domestic	Spanish Supercup	1	2024

- Record title holders

=== Other achievements ===
==== International competitions ====
- EuroLeague
  - Third place (1): 2006–07
- FIBA Korać Cup
  - Runners-up (1): 1999–00
- FIBA Champions League
  - Third place (1): 2025–26

==== Domestic competitions ====
- Spanish League
  - Runners-up (2): 1994–95, 2001–02
- Spanish Cup
  - Runners-up (2): 2009, 2020
- Spanish Supercup
  - Runners-up (3): 2006, 2015, 2023
- Liga de Verano ACB
- Winners (4): 1994, 1995, 2000, 2002
  - Runners-up (1): 1999

==== Other competitions ====
- 2nd division championships: (2)
  - 1ª División B: 1981, 1987
- Andalusia Cup: (19)
  - 1996, 2001, 2003, 2007, 2008, 2010, 2011, 2012, 2014, 2015, 2016, 2017, 2018, 2020, 2021, 2023, 2024, 2025, 2026.
- Torrox, Spain Invitational Game
  - 2008
- Trofeo de Platja d'Aro
  - 2008
- Trofeo Pollinica
  - 2008
- Trofeo Ciudad de Cordoba, Spain
  - 2009

=== Individual awards ===
ACB Finals MVP

- Michael Ansley – 1995
- Jorge Garbajosa – 2006

Spanish Cup MVP

- Jorge Garbajosa – 2005
- Tyson Carter – 2023
- Kendrick Perry – 2025

ACB Slam Dunk Champion

- Florent Piétrus – 2006
- James Gist – 2012

ACB Three Point Shootout Champion

- Paco Vázquez – 2001

All-EuroLeague Second Team

- Jorge Garbajosa – 2006

All-ACB First Team

- Jorge Garbajosa – 2005, 2006
- Jayson Granger – 2015
- Dylan Osetkowski – 2024

All-ACB Second Team

- Nemanja Nedović – 2017

EuroCup Finals MVP

- Alberto Díaz – 2017

Basketball Champions League Final Four MVP

- Kendrick Perry – 2024
- Tyson Carter – 2025

== Reserve team ==
Baloncesto Málaga B, known as Unicaja Andalucía, is the reserve team and plays in the Tercera FEB. The Unicaja Alhaurín de la Torre U22 team was created in 2025 and plays in Liga U.

From 2007 to 2016, Baloncesto Málaga had an agreement with CB Axarquía, for them to play as the club's main farm team, while Baloncesto Málaga B, which currently plays also under the name Unicaja, was the club's third team until the end of this contract.

== Women's team ==
On 14 July 2017, the club announced the creation of a women's team.

Just in its second season, Unicaja promoted to Liga Femenina 2.

=== Season by season ===
Season	Tier	Division	Pos.
2017–18	3	1ª División	2nd
2018–19	3	1ª División	1st
