= Tyson Carter =

American basketball player

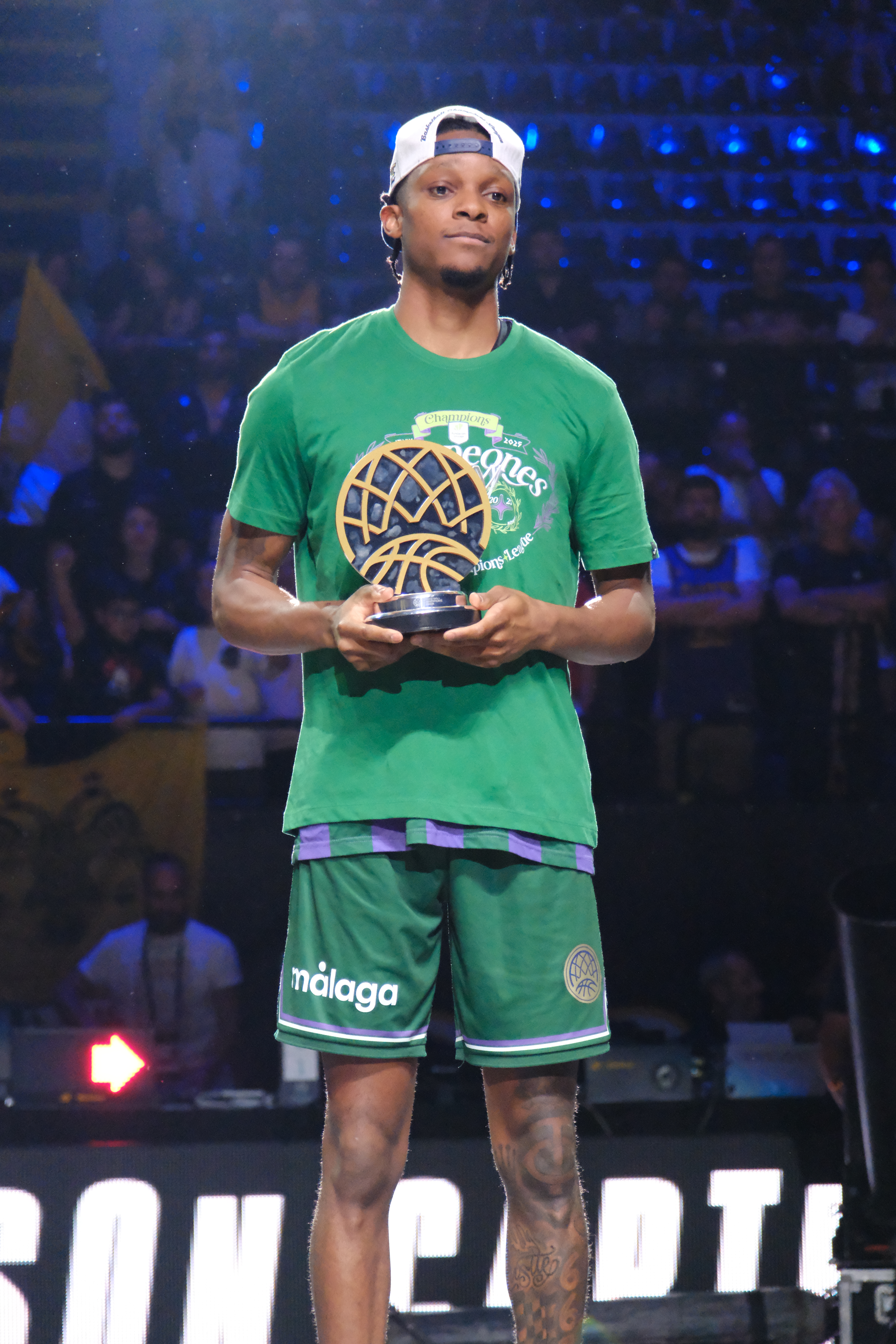

No. 11 – Crvena zvezda
- Position: Shooting guard / point guard
- League: KLS; ABA League; EuroLeague

Personal information
- Born: January 14, 1998 (age 28) Starkville, Mississippi, U.S.
- Listed height: 6 ft 4 in (1.93 m)
- Listed weight: 175 lb (79 kg)

Career information
- High school: Starkville (Starkville, Mississippi)
- College: Mississippi State (2016–2020)
- NBA draft: 2020: undrafted
- Playing career: 2020–present

Career history
- 2020–2021: Lavrio
- 2021–2022: Zenit Saint Petersburg
- 2022–2025: Unicaja
- 2025–present: Crvena zvezda

Career highlights
- FIBA Intercontinental Cup champion (2024); 2× FIBA Champions League champion (2024, 2025); FIBA Champions League Final Four MVP (2025); 2× Spanish Cup winner (2023, 2025); Spanish Supercup winner (2024); Spanish Cup MVP (2023); VTB United League champion (2022); All-Greek League Team (2021); SEC Sixth Man of the Year (2020)

Tyson Gregory Carter (born January 14, 1998) is an American professional basketball player for Crvena zvezda of the Basketball League of Serbia (KLS), the ABA League and the EuroLeague. He played college basketball for the Mississippi State Bulldogs.

== High school career ==
Carter played basketball for Starkville High School in Starkville, Mississippi, where his father served as the head coach. As a junior, he averaged 17 points and five assists per game, leading his team to the Class 6A state championship. In his senior season, Carter averaged 21.3 points, 5.2 assists, 4.4 rebounds and 2.1 steals per game, reaching the Class 6A state title game. He was named Mississippi Gatorade Player of the Year and played in the Mississippi-Alabama All-Star game. A four-star recruit, Carter committed to play college basketball for Mississippi State over an offer from Miami (Florida), among others.

== College career ==
Carter averaged 7.5 points and 1.7 rebounds per game as a freshman at Mississippi State. As a sophomore, he averaged 8.9 points, 1.8 rebounds and 1.2 assists per game. Carter posted 10.4 points, two rebounds and 1.2 steals per game as a junior. On November 8, 2019, he scored a season-high 28 points in a 67–58 win over Sam Houston State. As a senior, Carter averaged 13.9 points, 3.1 assists, 2.6 rebounds and 1.1 steals per game and had six games with 20 or more points. Carter started 16 of 31 games and was named the SEC Sixth Man of the Year, becoming the first Mississippi State player to earn that honor. Carter finished his college career with 216 three-pointers, fifth in Mississippi State history. He scored 1,352 points during his career, and alongside his father became the only father-son duo to both score over 1,000 points in SEC history.

== Professional career ==
On June 14, 2020, Carter signed his first professional contract with Lavrio of the Greek Basket League. In 33 games, he averaged 13.8 points, 3.3 rebounds, and 2.7 assists per game, leading the team to the league finals for the first time. On August 21, 2021, Carter agreed to renew his contract with the Greek club. In his second season, he averaged 16.5 points, 2.9 assists, and 2.8 rebounds per game in Greek league play. On December 19, Carter signed with Zenit Saint Petersburg of the VTB United League and the EuroLeague.

In 2022, Carter joined the Phoenix Suns' 2022 NBA Summer League roster.

On August 4, 2022, he has joined Liga ACB side Unicaja on loan.

On July 3, 2025, Carter signed with Crvena zvezda of the Basketball League of Serbia. In October 2025, Carter was hospitalized in Belgrade due to respiratory complications. In November 2025, three weeks later, he was released from the hospital after being treated for a pulmonary embolism.

== Career statistics ==
Legend
GP	Games played	GS	Games started	MPG	Minutes per game
FG%	Field goal percentage	3P%	3-point field goal percentage	FT%	Free throw percentage
RPG	Rebounds per game	APG	Assists per game	SPG	Steals per game
BPG	Blocks per game	PPG	Points per game	**Bold**	Career high

=== College ===
Year	Team	GP	GS	MPG	FG%	3P%	FT%	RPG	APG	SPG	BPG	PPG
2016–17	Mississippi State	32	12	20.2	.398	.361	.818	1.7	.7	.7	**.1**	7.5
2017–18	Mississippi State	**37**	**17**	22.8	.414	.341	.836	1.8	1.2	.8	.0	8.9
2018–19	Mississippi State	34	11	25.6	**.447**	**.366**	.800	2.0	1.5	**1.2**	.0	10.4
2019–20	Mississippi State	31	16	**28.6**	.405	.321	**.871**	**2.6**	**3.1**	1.1	**.1**	**13.9**
Career		134	56	24.3	.417	.346	.844	2.0	1.6	.9	.1	10.1

== Personal life ==
Carter's father, Greg, played basketball for Mississippi State for three years, earning All-SEC honors and being inducted to the school's Sports Hall of Fame. Greg later became the head coach of Starkville High School. Tyson has two daughters.
