= 2024–25 EuroLeague regular season =

International basketball club competition in Europe

The 2024–25 EuroLeague regular season began on 3 October 2024 and ended on 11 April 2025. A total of 18 teams competed in the regular season to decide the 10 places in the postseason of the 2024–25 EuroLeague.

A total of nine countries were represented in the regular season. This was the ninth season with the round-robin format, which replaces the group format used until the 2015–16 season. Paris Basketball will make its debut appearance in the European top flight.

== Format ==
The regular season began on 3 October 2024 and concluded on 11 April 2025. The 18 teams will play against each other home-and-away in a round-robin format over 34 rounds where only 10 teams will advance to the postseason. Moreover, the top six teams from regular season will receive a bye to the playoffs, while the teams placed from seventh to 10th will participate in the play-in to get the last two playoff spots. At the tail end of the standings, teams placed from 11th to 18th will be eliminated after the regular season.

=== Tiebreakers ===
Teams will be ranked according to their win–loss record. If two or more teams are equal on win–loss record upon completion of the regular season, the following tiebreaking criteria are applied, in the order given, to determine their rankings:

1. Best record in head-to-head games between all tied teams.
2. Higher cumulative score difference in head-to-head games between all tied teams.
3. Higher cumulative score difference for the entire regular season.
4. Higher total of points scored for the entire regular season.
5. Higher sum of quotients of points in favor and points against of each match played in the regular season.

If a tiebreaker does not resolve a tie completely, a new tiebreak process is initiated with only those teams that remain tied. All points scored in extra periods will not be counted in the standings, nor for any tie-break situation.

== Schedule ==
Below is the schedule of the regular season for the 2024–25 EuroLeague.

Round	Dates
Round 1	3–4 October 2024
Round 2	9–11 October 2024
Round 3	15–16 October 2024
Round 4	17–18 October 2024
Round 5	23–25 October 2024
Round 6	29–30 October 2024
Round 7	31 October–1 November 2024
Round 8	7–8 November 2024
Round 9	12–13 November 2024
Round 10	14–15 November 2024
Round 11	20–22 November 2024
Round 12	28–29 November 2024
Round 13	3–4 December 2024
Round 14	5–6 December 2024
Round 15	12–13 December 2024
Round 16	17–18 December 2024
Round 17	19–20 December 2024

Round	Dates
Round 18	26–27 December 2024
Round 19	2–3 January 2025
Round 20	9–10 January 2025
Round 21	14–15 January 2025
Round 22	16–17 January 2025
Round 23	23–24 January 2025
Round 24	30–31 January 2025
Round 25	4–5 February 2025
Round 26	6–7 February 2025
Round 27	27–28 February 2025
Round 28	5–7 March 2025
Round 29	13–14 March 2025
Round 30	18–21 March 2025
Round 31	25–26 March 2025
Round 32	27–28 March 2025
Round 33	3–4 April 2025
Round 34	10–11 April 2025

== League table ==
Pos	Team	Pld	W	L	PF	PA	PD	Qualification
1	(Hellenic Basketball Federation) Olympiacos	34	24	10	2941	2770	+171	Qualification to playoffs
2	(Turkish Basketball Federation) Fenerbahçe Beko	34	23	11	2829	2760	+69	Qualification to playoffs
3	(Hellenic Basketball Federation) Panathinaikos AKTOR	34	22	12	2990	2843	+147	Qualification to playoffs
4	(French Federation of Basketball) Monaco	34	21	13	2913	2801	+112	Qualification to playoffs
5	(Spanish Basketball Federation) Barcelona	34	20	14	2966	2837	+129	Qualification to playoffs
6	(Turkish Basketball Federation) Anadolu Efes	34	20	14	2941	2788	+153	Qualification to playoffs
7	(Spanish Basketball Federation) Real Madrid	34	20	14	2870	2797	+73	Qualification to play-in
8	(French Federation of Basketball) Paris Basketball	34	19	15	2940	2910	+30	Qualification to play-in
9	(German Basketball Federation) Bayern Munich	34	19	15	2965	2984	−19	Qualification to play-in
10	(Basketball Federation of Serbia) Crvena zvezda Meridianbet	34	18	16	2776	2714	+62	Qualification to play-in
11	(Italian Basketball Federation) EA7 Emporio Armani Milan	34	17	17	2896	2934	−38	
12	(Basketball Federation of Serbia) Partizan Mozzart Bet	34	16	18	2780	2724	+56	
13	(Lithuanian Basketball Federation) Žalgiris	34	15	19	2626	2669	−43	
14	(Spanish Basketball Federation) Baskonia	34	14	20	2795	2830	−35	
15	(French Federation of Basketball) LDLC ASVEL	34	13	21	2740	2897	−157	
16	(Israeli Basketball Association) Maccabi Playtika Tel Aviv	34	11	23	2921	3052	−131	
17	(Italian Basketball Federation) Virtus Segafredo Bologna	34	9	25	2683	2834	−151	
18	(German Basketball Federation) ALBA Berlin	34	5	29	2646	3074	−428	

Source: EuroLeague
Rules for classification: Regular season tiebreakers

== Round by round tables ==
=== Positions by round ===
The table lists the positions of teams after completion of each round. In order to preserve chronological evolvements, any postponed matches are not included in the round at which they were originally scheduled, but added to the full round they were played immediately afterwards.

Leader and qualification to playoffs	Qualification to playoffs	Qualification to play-in

Team ╲ Round	1	2	3	4	5	6	7	8	9	10	11	12	13	14	15	16	17	18	19	20	21	22	23	24	25	26	27	28	29	30	31	32	33	34
Olympiacos	17	12	4	7	11	8	6	5	4	3	2	3	2	3	5	3	3	2	2	1	1	1	1	1	1	1	1	1	1	1	1	2	1	1
Fenerbahçe Beko	2	3	9	5	9	6	4	2	2	1	1	2	3	2	4	6	5	6	5	4	2	2	2	2	2	2	2	2	2	2	2	1	2	2
Panathinaikos AKTOR	3	1	3	6	4	3	2	6	3	2	5	6	4	6	10	8	6	4	3	2	4	5	4	5	4	3	3	3	3	3	3	3	3	3
Monaco	1	2	5	3	7	5	9	7	9	7	6	4	5	4	2	1	2	1	1	3	3	4	3	3	3	4	5	4	4	4	4	4	4	4
Barcelona	13	5	2	2	1	1	3	1	1	5	8	7	8	8	11	9	10	11	12	8	8	6	7	9	8	9	11	9	6	5	8	8	8	5
Anadolu Efes	4	6	10	9	6	11	7	10	10	8	9	11	7	11	9	7	7	7	10	11	13	14	12	12	12	12	12	11	11	9	7	6	5	6
Real Madrid	14	9	13	10	3	9	11	12	11	11	10	10	12	13	13	13	12	10	8	7	7	8	6	8	10	11	10	12	12	10	9	7	6	7
Paris Basketball	10	15	11	15	13	10	10	8	5	4	4	1	1	1	1	2	1	3	4	6	5	3	5	4	7	7	4	7	8	7	10	10	10	8
Bayern Munich	5	13	15	14	10	7	5	4	7	6	3	5	6	5	3	5	4	5	7	10	10	10	9	7	6	6	7	5	5	8	6	5	7	9
Crvena zvezda Meridianbet	9	4	1	1	8	12	12	9	8	10	11	9	11	10	8	11	9	8	6	5	9	7	8	6	5	5	6	6	7	6	5	9	9	10
EA7 Emporio Armani Milan	18	14	17	17	17	17	15	13	13	13	12	12	9	7	6	10	11	12	9	9	6	9	11	10	11	10	9	10	9	11	12	12	12	11
Partizan Mozzart Bet	11	17	12	8	12	13	14	15	15	16	14	14	14	12	12	12	14	13	13	13	12	11	10	11	9	8	8	8	10	12	11	11	11	12
Žalgiris	7	8	6	4	2	2	1	3	6	9	7	8	10	9	7	4	8	9	11	12	11	12	13	13	13	13	13	13	13	13	13	13	13	13
Baskonia	8	10	8	12	5	4	8	11	12	12	13	13	13	14	14	14	15	14	15	15	15	15	15	15	15	14	14	14	14	14	14	14	14	14
LDLC ASVEL	12	11	14	11	14	15	16	17	17	15	16	16	15	15	15	15	13	15	14	14	14	13	14	14	14	15	15	15	15	15	15	15	15	15
Maccabi Playtika Tel Aviv	6	7	7	13	15	14	13	14	14	14	15	15	16	16	16	16	17	16	17	17	17	17	17	17	17	17	17	16	16	16	16	16	16	16
Virtus Segafredo Bologna	15	16	18	18	16	16	17	16	16	17	17	17	18	18	17	17	16	17	16	16	16	16	16	16	16	16	16	17	17	17	17	17	17	17
ALBA Berlin	16	18	16	16	18	18	18	18	18	18	18	18	17	17	18	18	18	18	18	18	18	18	18	18	18	18	18	18	18	18	18	18	18	18

Source: EuroLeague

=== Results by round ===
The table lists the results of teams in each round.

Win	Loss

Team ╲ Round	1	2	3	4	5	6	7	8	9	10	11	12	13	14	15	16	17	18	19	20	21	22	23	24	25	26	27	28	29	30	31	32	33	34
ALBA Berlin	L	L	W	L	L	L	L	L	W	L	L	L	W	L	L	L	L	L	L	L	L	L	L	W	L	L	L	L	W	L	L	L	L	L
Anadolu Efes	W	L	L	W	W	L	W	L	W	W	L	L	W	L	W	W	W	L	L	L	L	L	W	L	W	L	W	W	W	W	W	W	W	W
Barcelona	L	W	W	W	W	W	L	W	W	L	L	L	L	W	L	W	L	L	W	W	W	W	L	L	W	L	L	W	W	W	L	W	W	W
Baskonia	W	L	W	L	W	W	L	L	L	L	L	W	W	L	L	W	L	W	L	L	L	W	L	W	L	W	L	W	L	W	L	L	W	L
Bayern Munich	W	L	L	W	W	W	W	W	L	W	W	L	L	W	W	L	W	L	L	L	W	L	W	W	W	W	L	W	L	L	W	W	L	L
Crvena zvezda Meridianbet	W	W	W	L	L	L	L	W	W	L	L	W	L	W	W	L	W	W	W	W	L	W	L	W	W	W	L	L	L	W	W	L	L	L
EA7 Emporio Armani Milan	L	W	L	L	L	L	W	W	L	W	W	W	W	W	W	L	L	L	W	W	W	L	L	W	L	W	W	L	W	L	L	L	L	W
Fenerbahçe Beko	W	W	L	W	L	W	W	W	W	W	W	L	L	W	L	L	W	L	W	W	W	W	W	W	L	W	L	W	W	L	W	W	L	W
LDLC ASVEL	L	W	L	W	L	L	L	L	L	W	L	W	W	L	W	W	W	L	L	W	L	W	W	L	L	L	L	L	L	L	W	W	L	L
Maccabi Playtika Tel Aviv	W	L	W	L	L	L	W	L	L	L	L	W	L	L	L	L	L	W	L	L	L	L	W	L	L	L	W	W	W	W	L	L	W	L
Monaco	W	W	L	W	L	W	L	W	L	W	W	W	L	W	W	W	L	W	W	L	L	L	W	W	W	L	L	W	L	W	W	W	L	W
Olympiacos	L	W	W	L	L	W	W	W	W	W	W	L	W	L	L	W	W	W	W	W	W	W	L	W	W	W	W	W	W	L	L	L	W	W
Panathinaikos AKTOR	W	W	L	L	W	W	W	L	W	W	L	L	W	L	L	W	W	W	W	W	L	L	W	L	W	W	W	W	L	W	W	L	W	W
Paris Basketball	L	L	W	L	W	W	W	W	W	W	W	W	W	W	L	L	L	L	L	L	W	W	L	W	L	W	W	L	L	W	L	W	L	W
Partizan Mozzart Bet	L	L	W	W	L	L	L	L	L	L	W	W	W	W	W	L	L	W	W	L	W	W	W	L	W	W	W	L	L	L	W	L	L	L
Real Madrid	L	W	L	W	W	L	L	L	W	L	W	W	L	L	L	W	W	W	W	W	W	L	W	L	L	L	W	L	W	W	W	W	W	W
Virtus Segafredo Bologna	L	L	L	L	W	L	L	W	L	L	L	L	L	L	W	L	W	W	L	W	L	W	L	L	L	L	L	L	L	L	L	W	W	L
Žalgiris	W	L	W	W	W	W	W	L	L	L	W	L	L	W	W	W	L	L	L	L	W	L	L	L	W	L	W	L	W	L	L	L	W	L

Source: EuroLeague

== Matches ==
Times are CET or CEST, (Note: CEST (UTC+2) for dates up to 26 October 2024 (rounds 1–5) and from 30 March 2025 (rounds 33–34), and CET (UTC+1) for dates between 27 October 2024 and 29 March 2025 (rounds 6–32).) as listed by Euroleague Basketball.

=== Round 1 ===
3 October 2024	ALBA Berlin (German Basketball Federation)	77–87	(Hellenic Basketball Federation) Panathinaikos AKTOR	Berlin
18:45	Scoring by quarter: 17–26, 19–19, 21–17, 20–25
	Pts: McDowell-White 13; Rebs: Koumadje 13; Asts: Hermannsson 9 PIR: Koumadje, Hermannsson 18	Boxscore	Pts: Nunn 16; Rebs: Lessort 8 Asts: Sloukas, Brown 5 PIR: Lessort 23	Arena: Uber Arena; Attendance: 11,856; Referees: Damir Javor, Rain Peerandi, Artūras Šukys

3 October 2024	Žalgiris (Lithuanian Basketball Federation)	74–67	(Spanish Basketball Federation) Barcelona	Kaunas
19:00	Scoring by quarter: 21–14, 22–17, 7–17, 24–19
	Pts: Francisco 19; Rebs: Mitchell 6 Asts: Francisco 3 PIR: Francisco 22	Boxscore	Pts: Laprovíttola 12; Rebs: Satoranský 7 Asts: Laprovíttola 8 PIR: Laprovíttola 20	Arena: Žalgirio Arena; Attendance: 14,962; Referees: Emin Moğulkoç, Ioannis Foufis, Josip Radojković

3 October 2024	Monaco (French Federation of Basketball)	93–80	(Italian Basketball Federation) EA7 Emporio Armani Milan	Fontvieille
19:00	Scoring by quarter: 22–10, 25–16, 19–23, 27–31
	Pts: Diallo 20; Rebs: Motiejūnas 8 Asts: James 5 PIR: Diallo 26	Boxscore	Pts: Brooks 16; Rebs: Dimitrijević 6 Asts: Dimitrijević 5 PIR: three players 15	Arena: Salle Gaston Médecin; Attendance: 3,971; Referees: Carlos Peruga, Milan Nedović, Kristaps Konstantinovs

3 October 2024	Maccabi Playtika Tel Aviv (Israeli Basketball Association)	89–82	(French Federation of Basketball) LDLC ASVEL	Belgrade (Note: Since 24 October 2023, Maccabi Playtika Tel Aviv play their home matches in Belgrade due to the inability to host matches in Israel as a result of the Gaza war until further notice.)
20:05	Scoring by quarter: 24–31, 27–21, 20–19, 18–11
	Pts: Blatt 21; Rebs: Rivero 9 Asts: Blatt 13; PIR: Blatt 36	Boxscore	Pts: Lauvergne 17; Rebs: Black 5 Asts: three players 4 PIR: Maledon 17	Arena: Aleksandar Nikolić Hall; Attendance: 100; Referees: Saša Pukl, Tomislav Hordov, Marcin Kowalski

3 October 2024	Baskonia (Spanish Basketball Federation)	88–82	(Basketball Federation of Serbia) Partizan Mozzart Bet	Vitoria-Gasteiz
20:30	Scoring by quarter: 16–17, 16–21, 27–22, 29–22
	Pts: Howard 17; Rebs: Sedekerskis 6 Asts: Moneke, Forrest 4 PIR: Sedekerskis 21	Boxscore	Pts: T. Jones 22; Rebs: three players 4 Asts: C. Jones 6 PIR: T. Jones 28	Arena: Buesa Arena; Attendance: 10,127; Referees: Robert Lottermoser, Piotr Pastusiak, Joseph Bissang

3 October 2024	Bayern Munich (German Basketball Federation)	97–89	(Spanish Basketball Federation) Real Madrid	Munich
20:45	Scoring by quarter: 26–29, 26–22, 12–22, 33–16
	Pts: Napier 25; Rebs: Voigtmann 10; Asts: Edwards 6 PIR: Napier, Voigtmann 23	Boxscore	Pts: Campazzo 19; Rebs: Tavares 9 Asts: Campazzo 9 PIR: Campazzo 21	Arena: SAP Garden; Attendance: 10,088; Referees: Mehdi Difallah, Saulius Račys, Sašo Petek

4 October 2024	Fenerbahçe Beko (Turkish Basketball Federation)	82–71	(Hellenic Basketball Federation) Olympiacos	Istanbul
19:30	Scoring by quarter: 17–13, 15–23, 25–20, 25–15
	Pts: Baldwin 19; Rebs: Colson 9 Asts: Baldwin 7 PIR: Baldwin 26	Boxscore	Pts: Wright 15; Rebs: Wright 7 Asts: Walkup 5 PIR: Wright 17	Arena: Ülker Sports and Event Hall; Attendance: 10,113; Referees: Ilija Belošević, Uroš Nikolić, Jordi Aliaga

4 October 2024	Virtus Segafredo Bologna (Italian Basketball Federation)	67–76	(Turkish Basketball Federation) Anadolu Efes	Bologna
21:00	Scoring by quarter: 21–15, 15–21, 16–15, 15–25
	Pts: Cordinier 16; Rebs: four players 5 Asts: Shengelia, Clyburn 3 PIR: Cordinier 15	Boxscore	Pts: Oturu 14; Rebs: Oturu 9 Asts: Bryant, Larkin 3 PIR: Oturu 23	Arena: Unipol Arena; Attendance: 7,944; Referees: Sreten Radović, Gytis Vilius, Alberto Baena

4 October 2024	Paris Basketball (French Federation of Basketball)	77–80	(Basketball Federation of Serbia) Crvena zvezda Meridianbet	Paris
21:00	Scoring by quarter: 18–17, 25–18, 15–23, 19–22
	Pts: Shorts 16; Rebs: Jantunen 6 Asts: Shorts 4 PIR: Shorts 21	Boxscore	Pts: Nedović 21; Rebs: Bolomboy 11; Asts: Miller-McIntyre 7 PIR: Nedović 21	Arena: Adidas Arena; Attendance: 7,334; Referees: Carmelo Paternicò, Emilio Pérez, Anne Panther

=== Round 2 ===
9 October 2024	Monaco (French Federation of Basketball)	85–79	(Israeli Basketball Association) Maccabi Playtika Tel Aviv	Fontvieille
19:00	Scoring by quarter: 20–23, 21–23, 24–14, 20–19
	Pts: Okobo, James 17; Rebs: Jaiteh 8 Asts: James 6 PIR: James 22	Boxscore	Pts: Loyd 16; Rebs: Hoard 7 Asts: Blatt 10; PIR: Hoard 19	Arena: Salle Gaston Médecin; Attendance: 3,658; Referees: Ilija Belošević, Rain Peerandi, Michele Rossi

9 October 2024	Crvena zvezda Meridianbet (Basketball Federation of Serbia)	78–71	(Spanish Basketball Federation) Baskonia	Belgrade
20:00	Scoring by quarter: 25–20, 17–14, 17–15, 19–22
	Pts: Canaan 19; Rebs: Bolomboy 8 Asts: Miller-McIntyre 7 PIR: Bolomboy 17	Boxscore	Pts: Moneke 19; Rebs: Hall 7 Asts: Baldwin 4 PIR: Moneke 25	Arena: Belgrade Arena; Attendance: 19,285; Referees: Mehdi Difallah, Seffi Shemmesh, Oļegs Latiševs

10 October 2024	Anadolu Efes (Turkish Basketball Federation)	78–83	(Turkish Basketball Federation) Fenerbahçe Beko	Istanbul
19:30	Scoring by quarter: 21–27, 16–19, 14–14, 27–23
	Pts: Oturu 21; Rebs: Willis 7 Asts: Larkin 6 PIR: Oturu 28	Boxscore	Pts: Colson 16; Rebs: Birch 8 Asts: Hayes-Davis 5 PIR: Birch 15	Arena: Basketball Development Center; Attendance: 8,926; Referees: Miguel Ángel Pérez, Damir Javor, Ioannis Foufis

10 October 2024	LDLC ASVEL (French Federation of Basketball)	87–85	(Italian Basketball Federation) Virtus Segafredo Bologna	Villeurbanne
20:00	Scoring by quarter: 38–27, 19–22, 16–21, 14–15
	Pts: Sako 19; Rebs: Sako 11; Asts: de Colo 8 PIR: Sako 30	Boxscore	Pts: Cordinier 23; Rebs: Cordinier, Shengelia 5 Asts: Cordinier 6 PIR: Cordinier 26	Arena: Astroballe; Attendance: 4,974; Referees: Robert Lottermoser, Jakub Zamojski, Gentian Cici

10 October 2024	Panathinaikos AKTOR (Hellenic Basketball Federation)	94–79	(German Basketball Federation) Bayern Munich	Marousi
20:15	Scoring by quarter: 25–16, 22–18, 19–24, 28–21
	Pts: Lessort 22; Rebs: Hernangómez 11; Asts: Nunn 7 PIR: Lessort 27	Boxscore	Pts: Booker 15; Rebs: Booker 7 Asts: Madar 6 PIR: Booker 19	Arena: OAKA Altion; Attendance: 13,113; Referees: Uroš Nikolić, Emilio Pérez, Eduard Udyanskyy

10 October 2024	Real Madrid (Spanish Basketball Federation)	93–86	(Basketball Federation of Serbia) Partizan Mozzart Bet	Madrid
20:45	Scoring by quarter: 24–24, 26–23, 18–17, 25–22
	Pts: Ibaka 15; Rebs: Ibaka 7 Asts: Campazzo 11; PIR: Campazzo 22	Boxscore	Pts: C. Jones 15; Rebs: Davies 5 Asts: Bonga 6 PIR: C. Jones, T. Jones 16	Arena: WiZink Center; Attendance: 8,623; Referees: Emin Moğulkoç, Milan Nedović, Tomasz Trawicki

11 October 2024	Olympiacos (Hellenic Basketball Federation)	74–68	(Lithuanian Basketball Federation) Žalgiris	Piraeus
20:15	Scoring by quarter: 21–6, 14–18, 17–19, 22–25
	Pts: Vezenkov 17; Rebs: Vezenkov 11; Asts: Walkup 7 PIR: Vezenkov 30	Boxscore	Pts: Sirvydis 17; Rebs: Dunston 6 Asts: Francisco 6 PIR: Francisco, Sirvydis 14	Arena: Peace and Friendship Stadium; Attendance: 11,085; Referees: Sreten Radović, Milivoje Jovčić, Sašo Petek

11 October 2024	Barcelona (Spanish Basketball Federation)	88–73	(German Basketball Federation) ALBA Berlin	Barcelona
20:30	Scoring by quarter: 19–16, 24–21, 20–17, 25–19
	Pts: Brizuela 18; Rebs: Anderson, Hernangómez 5 Asts: Satoranský 8 PIR: Brizuela 16	Boxscore	Pts: Hermannsson 13; Rebs: Koumadje 8 Asts: Hermannsson 5 PIR: Koumadje 17	Arena: Palau Blaugrana; Attendance: 5,785; Referees: Robert Vyklický, Borys Ryzhyk, Mario Majkić

11 October 2024	EA7 Emporio Armani Milan (Italian Basketball Federation)	79–74	(French Federation of Basketball) Paris Basketball	Assago
20:30	Scoring by quarter: 20–18, 15–21, 23–18, 21–17
	Pts: Shields 21; Rebs: three players 6 Asts: Shields 5 PIR: Shields 29	Boxscore	Pts: Shorts 17; Rebs: Sy 7 Asts: Shorts 8 PIR: Shorts 21	Arena: Unipol Forum; Attendance: 8,226; Referees: Juan Carlos García, Saulius Račys, Vasiliki Tsaroucha

=== Round 3 ===
15 October 2024	ALBA Berlin (German Basketball Federation)	84–79	(French Federation of Basketball) LDLC ASVEL	Berlin
19:30	Scoring by quarter: 20–13, 16–23, 28–18, 20–25
	Pts: Hermannsson 21; Rebs: Williams 11; Asts: Williams 6 PIR: Hermannsson 20	Boxscore	Pts: Maledon 17; Rebs: Sako 13; Asts: four players 2 PIR: Maledon 22	Arena: Uber Arena; Attendance: 7,044; Referees: Seffi Shemmesh, Miloš Koljenšić, Vassilis Pitsilkas

15 October 2024	Maccabi Playtika Tel Aviv (Israeli Basketball Association)	93–91	(Turkish Basketball Federation) Anadolu Efes	Belgrade
20:05	Scoring by quarter: 23–24, 29–28, 20–22, 21–17
	Pts: Lee 23; Rebs: Rivero 6 Asts: Blatt, Lee 5 PIR: Lee 26	Boxscore	Pts: Poirier 22; Rebs: Osmani 6 Asts: Larkin 8 PIR: Poirier 23	Arena: Aleksandar Nikolić Hall; Attendance: 100; Referees: Juan Carlos García, Milivoje Jovčić, Maxime Boubert

15 October 2024	Fenerbahçe Beko (Turkish Basketball Federation)	57–76	(Basketball Federation of Serbia) Crvena zvezda Meridianbet	Istanbul
19:45	Scoring by quarter: 12–26, 19–12, 11–16, 15–22
	Pts: Hayes-Davis 20; Rebs: Hayes-Davis 8 Asts: Baldwin 5 PIR: Hayes-Davis 25	Boxscore	Pts: Bolomboy 18; Rebs: Bolomboy 11; Asts: Miller-McIntyre 8 PIR: Bolomboy 25	Arena: Ülker Sports and Event Hall; Attendance: 9,806; Referees: Piotr Pastusiak, Carlos Cortés, Thomas Bissuel

15 October 2024	Olympiacos (Hellenic Basketball Federation)	89–68	(Italian Basketball Federation) EA7 Emporio Armani Milan	Piraeus
20:15	Scoring by quarter: 23–17, 16–10, 24–21, 26–20
	Pts: McKissic, Vezenkov 22; Rebs: Vezenkov 7 Asts: Walkup 8 PIR: Vezenkov 31	Boxscore	Pts: LeDay 16; Rebs: Mirotić 8 Asts: Dimitrijević 7 PIR: LeDay 18	Arena: Peace and Friendship Stadium; Attendance: 10,347; Referees: Miguel Ángel Pérez, Jakub Zamojski, Steve Bittner

15 October 2024	Virtus Segafredo Bologna (Italian Basketball Federation)	68–71	(Lithuanian Basketball Federation) Žalgiris	Bologna
20:30	Scoring by quarter: 15–16, 15–28, 22–16, 16–11
	Pts: Clyburn 16; Rebs: Shengelia 11; Asts: Pajola 5 PIR: Shengelia, Pajola 17	Boxscore	Pts: Giedraitis 15; Rebs: Birutis, Smailagić 6 Asts: Francisco 8 PIR: Giedraitis 20	Arena: Unipol Arena; Attendance: 7,634; Referees: Carlos Peruga, Joseph Bissang, Eduard Udyanskyy

15 October 2024	Paris Basketball (French Federation of Basketball)	84–80	(Hellenic Basketball Federation) Panathinaikos AKTOR	Paris
20:30	Scoring by quarter: 21–19, 24–20, 24–20, 15–21
	Pts: Hifi 20; Rebs: Ward 7 Asts: Shorts 7 PIR: Hifi, Shorts 17	Boxscore	Pts: Lessort 19; Rebs: Lessort 11; Asts: Sloukas 5 PIR: Lessort 28	Arena: Accor Arena; Attendance: 10,632; Referees: Oļegs Latiševs, Jordi Aliaga, Uroš Obrknežević

15 October 2024	Baskonia (Spanish Basketball Federation)	76–72	(Spanish Basketball Federation) Real Madrid	Vitoria-Gasteiz
20:30	Scoring by quarter: 16–18, 20–17, 12–17, 28–20
	Pts: Howard 15; Rebs: Sedekerskis 8 Asts: Sedekerskis 5 PIR: Moneke 21	Boxscore	Pts: Musa 17; Rebs: Tavares 15; Asts: Llull 7 PIR: Tavares 29	Arena: Buesa Arena; Attendance: 11,044; Referees: Saša Pukl, Artūras Šukys, Sérgio Silva

15 October 2024	Partizan Mozzart Bet (Basketball Federation of Serbia)	86–78	(German Basketball Federation) Bayern Munich	Belgrade
20:45	Scoring by quarter: 24–15, 25–17, 22–20, 15–26
	Pts: Brown 22; Rebs: C. Jones 5 Asts: Davies 4 PIR: C. Jones 19	Boxscore	Pts: Obst 15; Rebs: Weiler-Babb 6 Asts: Weiler-Babb, Napier 3 PIR: Obst 18	Arena: Belgrade Arena; Attendance: 20,111; Referees: Carmelo Paternicò, Robert Vyklický, Guido Giovannetti

16 October 2024	Barcelona (Spanish Basketball Federation)	86–71	(French Federation of Basketball) Monaco	Barcelona
20:30	Scoring by quarter: 26–18, 21–21, 24–15, 15–17
	Pts: Punter 21; Rebs: Metu 7 Asts: four players 3 PIR: Punter 20	Boxscore	Pts: Okobo 13; Rebs: Diallo 6 Asts: Okobo 7 PIR: Okobo 18	Arena: Palau Blaugrana; Attendance: 5,359; Referees: Tomislav Hordov, Anne Panther, Marcin Kowalski

=== Round 4 ===
17 October 2024	ALBA Berlin (German Basketball Federation)	71–78	(Turkish Basketball Federation) Fenerbahçe Beko	Berlin
19:30	Scoring by quarter: 16–15, 15–23, 16–20, 24–20
	Pts: Spagnolo, Hermannsson 13; Rebs: Williams 8 Asts: Hermannsson 5 PIR: Spagnolo 17	Boxscore	Pts: Hayes-Davis 14; Rebs: Marjanović 6 Asts: Baldwin 4 PIR: Melli 19	Arena: Uber Arena; Attendance: 11,847; Referees: Saša Pukl, Alberto Baena, Denis Hadžić

17 October 2024	Maccabi Playtika Tel Aviv (Israeli Basketball Association)	79–91	(Basketball Federation of Serbia) Partizan Mozzart Bet	Belgrade
20:05	Scoring by quarter: 27–28, 19–14, 18–24, 15–25
	Pts: Randolph 19; Rebs: Blatt 9 Asts: Blatt 9 PIR: Blatt 26	Boxscore	Pts: Brown 20; Rebs: T. Jones 5 Asts: C. Jones 6 PIR: Brown 23	Arena: Aleksandar Nikolić Hall; Attendance: 650; Referees: Carlos Peruga, Josip Radojković, Hugues Thépénier

17 October 2024	EA7 Emporio Armani Milan (Italian Basketball Federation)	82–85	(Lithuanian Basketball Federation) Žalgiris	Assago
20:30	Scoring by quarter: 24–17, 25–14, 17–17, 16–37
	Pts: Mirotić 17; Rebs: Mirotić 11; Asts: Dimitrijević 4 PIR: Mirotić 27	Boxscore	Pts: Giedraitis 21; Rebs: Butkevičius 6 Asts: Francisco 6 PIR: Francisco, Giedraitis 23	Arena: Unipol Forum; Attendance: 7,315; Referees: Emilio Pérez, Igor Dragojević, Hüseyin Çelik

17 October 2024	Real Madrid (Spanish Basketball Federation)	90–86	(Hellenic Basketball Federation) Panathinaikos AKTOR	Madrid
20:45	Scoring by quarter: 28–19, 15–19, 27–20, 20–28
	Pts: Campazzo 19; Rebs: Ndiaye, Tavares 6 Asts: Campazzo 6 PIR: Campazzo 28	Boxscore	Pts: Nunn 23; Rebs: Lessort 7 Asts: Nunn 6 PIR: Nunn 25	Arena: WiZink Center; Attendance: 10,175; Referees: Sreten Radović, Gytis Vilius, Kristaps Konstantinovs

17 October 2024	Bayern Munich (German Basketball Federation)	109–107	(French Federation of Basketball) Paris Basketball	Munich
20:45	Scoring by quarter: 24–21, 30–26, 27–31, 28–29
	Pts: Edwards 32; Rebs: three players 7 Asts: Voigtmann, Napier 5 PIR: Napier 29	Boxscore	Pts: Shorts 22; Rebs: Jantunen 7 Asts: Shorts 9 PIR: Shorts 26	Arena: SAP Garden; Attendance: 10,975; Referees: Ilija Belošević, Miloš Koljenšić, Dragan Porobić

18 October 2024	Monaco (French Federation of Basketball)	101–85	(Italian Basketball Federation) Virtus Segafredo Bologna	Fontvieille
19:00	Scoring by quarter: 20–24, 26–23, 25–17, 30–21
	Pts: Okobo 20; Rebs: Jaiteh 7 Asts: Okobo 6 PIR: James 29	Boxscore	Pts: Shengelia 17; Rebs: Cordinier 6 Asts: Cordinier, Morgan 4 PIR: Shengelia 25	Arena: Salle Gaston Médecin; Attendance: 2,432; Referees: Damir Javor, Tomasz Trawicki, Nick Van den Broeck

18 October 2024	Anadolu Efes (Turkish Basketball Federation)	91–89	(Hellenic Basketball Federation) Olympiacos	Istanbul
19:30	Scoring by quarter: 11–23, 30–21, 24–26, 26–19
	Pts: Larkin 24; Rebs: Nwora, Poirier 7 Asts: Bryant 6 PIR: Larkin 30	Boxscore	Pts: Fournier 20; Rebs: Vezenkov 6 Asts: McKissic, Papanikolaou 5 PIR: McKissic 18	Arena: Basketball Development Center; Attendance: 9,907; Referees: Mehdi Difallah, Oļegs Latiševs, Gentian Cici

18 October 2024	LDLC ASVEL (French Federation of Basketball)	76–69	(Spanish Basketball Federation) Baskonia	Décines-Charpieu
20:30	Scoring by quarter: 20–12, 18–14, 15–28, 23–15
	Pts: Maledon 25; Rebs: Sako 12; Asts: Lee 5 PIR: Maledon 36	Boxscore	Pts: Moneke 18; Rebs: Moneke 8 Asts: Moneke 4 PIR: Moneke 25	Arena: LDLC Arena; Attendance: 7,848; Referees: Milan Nedović, Borys Ryzhyk, Leandro Lezcano

18 October 2024	Crvena zvezda Meridianbet (Basketball Federation of Serbia)	94–98(OT)	(Spanish Basketball Federation) Barcelona	Belgrade
20:00	Scoring by quarter: 25–26, 22–18, 19–19, 18–21, Overtime: 10–14
	Pts: Yago 23; Rebs: Bolomboy 7 Asts: Teodosić 5 PIR: Yago 25	Boxscore	Pts: Punter 26; Rebs: Veselý 5 Asts: Laprovíttola 7 PIR: Punter 30	Arena: Belgrade Arena; Attendance: 20,991; Referees: Robert Lottermoser, Michele Rossi, Vasiliki Tsaroucha

=== Round 5 ===
23 October 2024	Partizan Mozzart Bet (Basketball Federation of Serbia)	69–70	(Italian Basketball Federation) Virtus Segafredo Bologna	Belgrade
20:30	Scoring by quarter: 20–15, 17–17, 24–25, 8–13
	Pts: T. Jones 20; Rebs: Bonga, T. Jones 6 Asts: Bonga 4 PIR: T. Jones 32	Boxscore	Pts: Clyburn 27; Rebs: Cordinier 10; Asts: Cordinier, Morgan 3 PIR: Cordinier 24	Arena: Belgrade Arena; Attendance: 19,851; Referees: Miguel Ángel Pérez, Juan Carlos García, Kristaps Konstantinovs

24 October 2024	Žalgiris (Lithuanian Basketball Federation)	78–63	(Israeli Basketball Association) Maccabi Playtika Tel Aviv	Kaunas
19:00	Scoring by quarter: 26–7, 18–17, 15–22, 19–17
	Pts: Ulanovas 14; Rebs: Mitchell, Sirvydis 5 Asts: Francisco 5 PIR: three players 12	Boxscore	Pts: Lee 17; Rebs: Hoard 8 Asts: three players 2 PIR: Lee, Rivero 21	Arena: Žalgirio Arena; Attendance: 14,773; Referees: Piotr Pastusiak, Jordi Aliaga, Aare Halliko

24 October 2024	Monaco (French Federation of Basketball)	80–87	(French Federation of Basketball) Paris Basketball	Fontvieille
19:00	Scoring by quarter: 22–25, 21–24, 21–14, 16–24
	Pts: three players 13; Rebs: Jaiteh 10; Asts: Okobo 7 PIR: James 16	Boxscore	Pts: Shorts 28; Rebs: Hayes, Ouattara 5 Asts: Shorts 10; PIR: Shorts 38	Arena: Salle Gaston Médecin; Attendance: 4,614; Referees: Emin Moğulkoç, Artūras Šukys, Alberto Baena

24 October 2024	Baskonia (Spanish Basketball Federation)	80–57	(German Basketball Federation) ALBA Berlin	Vitoria-Gasteiz
20:30	Scoring by quarter: 24–13, 15–13, 24–14, 17–17
	Pts: Howard 26; Rebs: Diop 8 Asts: Baldwin 6 PIR: Howard 17	Boxscore	Pts: Hermannsson 16; Rebs: Koumadje 9 Asts: Spagnolo 6 PIR: Wetzell 15	Arena: Buesa Arena; Attendance: 8,041; Referees: Uroš Nikolić, Milivoje Jovčić, Noam Gordon

24 October 2024	EA7 Emporio Armani Milan (Italian Basketball Federation)	84–96	(Turkish Basketball Federation) Anadolu Efes	Assago
20:30	Scoring by quarter: 11–23, 14–23, 34–20, 25–30
	Pts: Mirotić 29; Rebs: LeDay 7 Asts: Bolmaro 7 PIR: Mirotić 27	Boxscore	Pts: Bryant 19; Rebs: Osmani 6 Asts: Thompson 7 PIR: Bryant 22	Arena: Unipol Forum; Attendance: 7,521; Referees: Sreten Radović, Sérgio Silva, Thomas Bissuel

24 October 2024	Real Madrid (Spanish Basketball Federation)	95–72	(Basketball Federation of Serbia) Crvena zvezda Meridianbet	Madrid
20:45	Scoring by quarter: 22–10, 24–19, 25–25, 24–18
	Pts: Musa 17; Rebs: three players 6 Asts: Hezonja, Campazzo 6 PIR: Campazzo 30	Boxscore	Pts: Teodosić 11; Rebs: Davidovac 7 Asts: Teodosić 4 PIR: Teodosić, Kalinić 12	Arena: WiZink Center; Attendance: 8,387; Referees: Mehdi Difallah, Rain Peerandi, Hugues Thépénier

25 October 2024	Fenerbahçe Beko (Turkish Basketball Federation)	76–81	(Hellenic Basketball Federation) Panathinaikos AKTOR	Istanbul
19:45	Scoring by quarter: 15–21, 20–25, 19–16, 22–19
	Pts: Biberović 16; Rebs: Colson, Biberović 6 Asts: Baldwin 4 PIR: Biberović 18	Boxscore	Pts: Nunn 15; Rebs: Yurtseven 6 Asts: Brown 5 PIR: Lessort 22	Arena: Ülker Sports and Event Hall; Attendance: 12,672; Referees: Carlos Peruga, Milan Nedović, Artūras Šukys

25 October 2024	Barcelona (Spanish Basketball Federation)	90–83	(French Federation of Basketball) LDLC ASVEL	Barcelona
20:30	Scoring by quarter: 17–20, 26–24, 26–25, 21–14
	Pts: Punter 20; Rebs: Metu, Veselý 5 Asts: three players 4 PIR: Veselý 26	Boxscore	Pts: Maledon 21; Rebs: Sako 9 Asts: de Colo, Jackson 4 PIR: Sako 22	Arena: Palau Blaugrana; Attendance: 5,542; Referees: Carmelo Paternicò, Jakub Zamojski, Marko Juras

25 October 2024	Bayern Munich (German Basketball Federation)	84–80	(Hellenic Basketball Federation) Olympiacos	Munich
20:45	Scoring by quarter: 20–19, 12–24, 27–18, 25–19
	Pts: Edwards 30; Rebs: Voigtmann 8 Asts: Weiler-Babb 9 PIR: Booker, Edwards 21	Boxscore	Pts: Vezenkov 16; Rebs: Vezenkov 7 Asts: Papanikolaou 4 PIR: Vezenkov 23	Arena: SAP Garden; Attendance: 10,765; Referees: Tomislav Hordov, Carlos Cortés, Jurgis Laurinavičius

=== Round 6 ===
29 October 2024	Anadolu Efes (Turkish Basketball Federation)	88–97	(Spanish Basketball Federation) Barcelona	Istanbul
18:30	Scoring by quarter: 26–29, 25–26, 15–21, 22–21
	Pts: Thompson 16; Rebs: Nwora, Poirier 6 Asts: Thompson 6 PIR: Thompson 21	Boxscore	Pts: Metu 21; Rebs: Veselý 5 Asts: Núñez 7 PIR: Metu, Punter 20	Arena: Basketball Development Center; Attendance: 9,967; Referees: Saša Pukl, Uroš Nikolić, Steve Bittner

29 October 2024	ALBA Berlin (German Basketball Federation)	83–92	(French Federation of Basketball) Paris Basketball	Berlin
19:30	Scoring by quarter: 26–16, 18–21, 19–28, 20–27
	Pts: Schneider 18; Rebs: Bean 14; Asts: Hermannsson 6 PIR: Bean 34	Boxscore	Pts: Hifi 25; Rebs: Jantunen 8 Asts: Shorts 9 PIR: Jantunen 21	Arena: Uber Arena; Attendance: 8,641; Referees: Carmelo Paternicò, Tomislav Hordov, Vasiliki Tsaroucha

29 October 2024	Fenerbahçe Beko (Turkish Basketball Federation)	84–82	(Israeli Basketball Association) Maccabi Playtika Tel Aviv	Kaunas (Note: The match, originally to be played at Ülker Sports and Event Hall in Istanbul, was relocated to Lithuania on recommendation of both Turkish and Israeli governments regarding the Gaza war.)
19:30	Scoring by quarter: 16–21, 22–19, 20–27, 26–15
	Pts: Hayes-Davis 20; Rebs: Biberović 6 Asts: Hall 9 PIR: Hall 21	Boxscore	Pts: Hoard 20; Rebs: Sorkin 9 Asts: Jokubaitis 7 PIR: Hoard 21	Arena: Žalgirio Arena; Attendance: 1,416; Referees: Miguel Ángel Pérez, Michele Rossi, Luka Kardum

29 October 2024	Olympiacos (Hellenic Basketball Federation)	79–69	(Spanish Basketball Federation) Real Madrid	Piraeus
20:15	Scoring by quarter: 17–21, 19–13, 20–25, 23–10
	Pts: Vezenkov 23; Rebs: McKissic 9 Asts: Fall 6 PIR: Vezenkov 25	Boxscore	Pts: Hezonja 15; Rebs: Tavares 6 Asts: Campazzo 10; PIR: Hezonja 17	Arena: Peace and Friendship Stadium; Attendance: 12,349; Referees: Damir Javor, Milivoje Jovčić, Milan Nedović

29 October 2024	Baskonia (Spanish Basketball Federation)	88–83	(Italian Basketball Federation) EA7 Emporio Armani Milan	Vitoria-Gasteiz
20:30	Scoring by quarter: 20–21, 32–24, 15–18, 21–20
	Pts: Forrest 22; Rebs: Diop 11; Asts: Baldwin 7 PIR: Diop 21	Boxscore	Pts: Mirotić 21; Rebs: Mirotić, Nebo 6 Asts: Bolmaro 8 PIR: Mirotić 20	Arena: Buesa Arena; Attendance: 8,421; Referees: Mehdi Difallah, Miloš Koljenšić, Kristaps Konstantinovs

29 October 2024	Virtus Segafredo Bologna (Italian Basketball Federation)	84–87	(German Basketball Federation) Bayern Munich	Bologna
21:00	Scoring by quarter: 25–19, 8–21, 27–28, 24–19
	Pts: Shengelia 21; Rebs: Diouf 5 Asts: Cordinier 5 PIR: Cordinier 20	Boxscore	Pts: Edwards 26; Rebs: da Silva, Weiler-Babb 7 Asts: Napier 7 PIR: Napier 26	Arena: Unipol Arena; Attendance: 7,239; Referees: Oļegs Latiševs, Borys Ryzhyk, Hüseyin Çelik

30 October 2024	Žalgiris (Lithuanian Basketball Federation)	86–84	(Basketball Federation of Serbia) Crvena zvezda Meridianbet	Kaunas
19:00	Scoring by quarter: 24–18, 23–15, 19–24, 20–27
	Pts: Sirvydis 17; Rebs: Butkevičius 4 Asts: Francisco 7 PIR: Francisco 20	Boxscore	Pts: Miller-McIntyre, Plavšić 16; Rebs: Plavšić 9 Asts: Miller-McIntyre, Nedović 5 PIR: Plavšić 23	Arena: Žalgirio Arena; Attendance: 15,015; Referees: Joseph Bissang, Sérgio Silva, Tomasz Trawicki

30 October 2024	Panathinaikos AKTOR (Hellenic Basketball Federation)	92–68	(French Federation of Basketball) LDLC ASVEL	Marousi
20:15	Scoring by quarter: 27–14, 18–15, 25–23, 22–16
	Pts: Brown 17; Rebs: Mitoglou 7 Asts: Grant 7 PIR: Hernangómez 24	Boxscore	Pts: Jackson 13; Rebs: Ajinça 5 Asts: de Colo, Maledon 5 PIR: Jackson, Harrison 13	Arena: OAKA Altion; Attendance: 13,320; Referees: Emin Moğulkoç, Anne Panther, Uroš Obrknežević

30 October 2024	Partizan Mozzart Bet (Basketball Federation of Serbia)	74–79	(French Federation of Basketball) Monaco	Belgrade
20:45	Scoring by quarter: 21–23, 12–23, 23–15, 18–18
	Pts: Lundberg, C. Jones 15; Rebs: T. Jones, Bonga 10; Asts: C. Jones 4 PIR: Bonga 22	Boxscore	Pts: Diallo 18; Rebs: Diallo 6 Asts: James 4 PIR: Diallo 21	Arena: Belgrade Arena; Attendance: 7,494; Referees: Emilio Pérez, Ioannis Foufis, Carlos Cortés

=== Round 7 ===
31 October 2024	ALBA Berlin (German Basketball Federation)	70–86	(Turkish Basketball Federation) Anadolu Efes	Berlin
20:00	Scoring by quarter: 19–25, 16–26, 17–17, 18–18
	Pts: Hermannsson 24; Rebs: Williams 8 Asts: Samar 4 PIR: Hermannsson 19	Boxscore	Pts: Nwora, Oturu 16; Rebs: Bryant 6 Asts: Thompson 8 PIR: Thompson 23	Arena: Uber Arena; Attendance: 8,356; Referees: Milan Nedović, Marcin Kowalski, Stefan Ćalić

31 October 2024	Maccabi Playtika Tel Aviv (Israeli Basketball Association)	79–78	(Spanish Basketball Federation) Real Madrid	Belgrade
20:05	Scoring by quarter: 21–23, 15–20, 19–21, 24–14
	Pts: Lee 19; Rebs: Rayman 14; Asts: Jokubaitis 7 PIR: Hoard 17	Boxscore	Pts: Hezonja 18; Rebs: Tavares 7 Asts: Campazzo 7 PIR: Campazzo 22	Arena: Aleksandar Nikolić Hall; Attendance: 0 Referees: Tomislav Hordov, Saulius Račys, Nick Van den Broeck

31 October 2024	Olympiacos (Hellenic Basketball Federation)	95–74	(Spanish Basketball Federation) Barcelona	Piraeus
20:15	Scoring by quarter: 21–17, 23–19, 21–14, 30–24
	Pts: Fournier 19; Rebs: Milutinov 8 Asts: Walkup 7 PIR: Vezenkov 27	Boxscore	Pts: Punter 18; Rebs: Metu 7 Asts: Satoranský 4 PIR: Punter 19	Arena: Peace and Friendship Stadium; Attendance: 12,349; Referees: Sreten Radović, Piotr Pastusiak, Sašo Petek

31 October 2024	EA7 Emporio Armani Milan (Italian Basketball Federation)	99–90	(Italian Basketball Federation) Virtus Segafredo Bologna	Assago
20:30	Scoring by quarter: 21–14, 23–21, 22–32, 33–23
	Pts: Mirotić 21; Rebs: Mirotić 13; Asts: Dimitrijević 9 PIR: LeDay 29	Boxscore	Pts: Shengelia 25; Rebs: Diouf 5 Asts: Morgan 10; PIR: Shengelia 26	Arena: Unipol Forum; Attendance: 9,862; Referees: Ilija Belošević, Uroš Nikolić, Artūras Šukys

1 November 2024	Fenerbahçe Beko (Turkish Basketball Federation)	89–72	(Basketball Federation of Serbia) Partizan Mozzart Bet	Istanbul
18:45	Scoring by quarter: 22–15, 22–16, 23–22, 22–19
	Pts: Hayes-Davis 24; Rebs: three players 5 Asts: Baldwin 8 PIR: Hayes-Davis 23	Boxscore	Pts: Ntilikina 14; Rebs: Pokuševski 5 Asts: three players 3 PIR: Pokuševski 14	Arena: Ülker Sports and Event Hall; Attendance: 12,710; Referees: Gytis Vilius, Jordi Aliaga, Alberto Baena

1 November 2024	Žalgiris (Lithuanian Basketball Federation)	63–62	(French Federation of Basketball) Monaco	Kaunas
19:00	Scoring by quarter: 20–11, 14–14, 9–18, 20–19
	Pts: Butkevičius 13; Rebs: Brazdeikis 6 Asts: Francisco, Giedraitis 4 PIR: Birutis, Butkevičius 11	Boxscore	Pts: Loyd 18; Rebs: Blossomgame 9 Asts: Loyd, James 4 PIR: Loyd 23	Arena: Žalgirio Arena; Attendance: 14,922; Referees: Saša Pukl, Jakub Zamojski, Vassilis Pitsilkas

1 November 2024	LDLC ASVEL (French Federation of Basketball)	71–84	(German Basketball Federation) Bayern Munich	Décines-Charpieu
20:00	Scoring by quarter: 17–19, 16–24, 16–21, 22–20
	Pts: de Colo 19; Rebs: Sako 9 Asts: de Colo 7 PIR: de Colo 21	Boxscore	Pts: Booker 16; Rebs: Voigtmann 11; Asts: Weiler-Babb 7 PIR: Weiler-Babb, Voigtmann 16	Arena: LDLC Arena; Attendance: 8,111; Referees: Carlos Peruga, Rain Peerandi, Eduard Udyanskyy

1 November 2024	Crvena zvezda Meridianbet (Basketball Federation of Serbia)	77–81	(Hellenic Basketball Federation) Panathinaikos AKTOR	Belgrade
20:00	Scoring by quarter: 18–18, 28–20, 12–17, 19–26
	Pts: Canaan 20; Rebs: Petrušev, Plavšić 6 Asts: Yago 7 PIR: Canaan, Yago 18	Boxscore	Pts: Nunn 13; Rebs: Lessort 9 Asts: Brown, Sloukas 3 PIR: Lessort 18	Arena: Aleksandar Nikolić Hall; Attendance: 7,937; Referees: Juan Carlos García, Seffi Shemmesh, Robert Vyklický

1 November 2024	Paris Basketball (French Federation of Basketball)	67–65	(Spanish Basketball Federation) Baskonia	Paris
20:45	Scoring by quarter: 18–16, 20–19, 19–13, 10–17
	Pts: three players 9 Rebs: Jantunen 8 Asts: Shorts 5 PIR: Jantunen 15	Boxscore	Pts: Moneke 19; Rebs: Moneke 12; Asts: Jaramaz 4 PIR: Moneke 30	Arena: Adidas Arena; Attendance: 7,756; Referees: Oļegs Latiševs, Igor Dragojević, Josip Radojković

=== Round 8 ===
7 November 2024	Crvena zvezda Meridianbet (Basketball Federation of Serbia)	92–71	(German Basketball Federation) ALBA Berlin	Belgrade
19:00	Scoring by quarter: 23–14, 18–18, 22–18, 29–21
	Pts: Miller-McIntyre 15; Rebs: Kalinić 7 Asts: Miller-McIntyre 8 PIR: Kalinić, Miller-McIntyre 20	Boxscore	Pts: Procida 25; Rebs: Procida, Williams 7 Asts: Hermannsson 6 PIR: Procida 34	Arena: Aleksandar Nikolić Hall; Attendance: 7,467; Referees: Emin Moğulkoç, Carlos Cortés, Sergio Manuel

7 November 2024	EA7 Emporio Armani Milan (Italian Basketball Federation)	85–76	(Spanish Basketball Federation) Real Madrid	Assago
20:30	Scoring by quarter: 24–16, 23–24, 15–15, 23–21
	Pts: Dimitrijević 22; Rebs: LeDay 8 Asts: Mannion 5 PIR: LeDay 23	Boxscore	Pts: Ibaka, Hezonja 13; Rebs: Tavares 9 Asts: Llull 4 PIR: Ibaka, Deck 15	Arena: Unipol Forum; Attendance: 9,309; Referees: Saša Pukl, Gytis Vilius, Uroš Obrknežević

7 November 2024	Paris Basketball (French Federation of Basketball)	74–71	(Basketball Federation of Serbia) Partizan Mozzart Bet	Paris
20:45	Scoring by quarter: 21–16, 16–19, 19–22, 18–14
	Pts: Hifi 17; Rebs: Jantunen 8 Asts: Shorts 8 PIR: Hifi 18	Boxscore	Pts: C. Jones 20; Rebs: T. Jones 10; Asts: C. Jones 10; PIR: C. Jones 32	Arena: Adidas Arena; Attendance: 6,393; Referees: Carlos Peruga, Piotr Pastusiak, Christian Theis

7 November 2024	Bayern Munich (German Basketball Federation)	77–74	(Lithuanian Basketball Federation) Žalgiris	Munich
20:45	Scoring by quarter: 19–7, 19–21, 20–19, 19–27
	Pts: Edwards 24; Rebs: Obst 7 Asts: Edwards 5 PIR: Edwards 21	Boxscore	Pts: Francisco 20; Rebs: Dunston 8 Asts: Butkevičius 4 PIR: Ulanovas 20	Arena: SAP Garden; Attendance: 10,782; Referees: Mehdi Difallah, Ioannis Foufis, Maxime Boubert

8 November 2024	Anadolu Efes (Turkish Basketball Federation)	69–81	(French Federation of Basketball) Monaco	Istanbul
18:00	Scoring by quarter: 23–22, 18–14, 18–16, 10–29
	Pts: Poirier 14; Rebs: Poirier 8 Asts: Thompson 10; PIR: Poirier 25	Boxscore	Pts: Papagiannis 15; Rebs: Papagiannis 7 Asts: James 6 PIR: Papagiannis 20	Arena: Basketball Development Center; Attendance: 9,316; Referees: Ilija Belošević, Carmelo Paternicò, Nick Van den Broeck

8 November 2024	LDLC ASVEL (French Federation of Basketball)	73–77	(Turkish Basketball Federation) Fenerbahçe Beko	Décines-Charpieu
20:00	Scoring by quarter: 19–15, 17–18, 16–18, 21–26
	Pts: de Colo 18; Rebs: Black, Sako 6 Asts: de Colo 11; PIR: de Colo 29	Boxscore	Pts: Hayes-Davis 25; Rebs: Şanlı 8 Asts: Gudurić, Hall 5 PIR: Hayes-Davis 24	Arena: LDLC Arena; Attendance: 7,303; Referees: Tomislav Hordov, Milivoje Jovčić, Manuel Attard

8 November 2024	Panathinaikos AKTOR (Hellenic Basketball Federation)	89–94	(Hellenic Basketball Federation) Olympiacos	Marousi
20:15	Scoring by quarter: 15–20, 18–21, 33–30, 23–23
	Pts: Nunn 20; Rebs: Hernangómez 6 Asts: Sloukas 7 PIR: Nunn 24	Boxscore	Pts: Fournier 22; Rebs: Milutinov 8 Asts: Walkup 11; PIR: Milutinov 21	Arena: OAKA Altion; Attendance: 17,905; Referees: Emilio Pérez, Oļegs Latiševs, Uroš Nikolić

8 November 2024	Virtus Segafredo Bologna (Italian Basketball Federation)	84–77	(Israeli Basketball Association) Maccabi Playtika Tel Aviv	Bologna
20:30	Scoring by quarter: 25–17, 20–22, 15–16, 24–22
	Pts: Shengelia 16; Rebs: Žižić 9 Asts: Pajola 6 PIR: Žižić 24	Boxscore	Pts: Randolph 21; Rebs: Hoard 8 Asts: Jokubaitis 6 PIR: Randolph 20	Arena: Unipol Arena; Attendance: 7,018; Referees: Juan Carlos García, Joseph Bissang, Leandro Lezcano

8 November 2024	Barcelona (Spanish Basketball Federation)	91–68	(Spanish Basketball Federation) Baskonia	Barcelona
20:30	Scoring by quarter: 26–17, 18–16, 18–18, 29–17
	Pts: Veselý 17; Rebs: Veselý 10; Asts: Brizuela 5 PIR: Veselý 28	Boxscore	Pts: Forrest 17; Rebs: Moneke, Hall 6 Asts: Baldwin 5 PIR: Moneke 19	Arena: Palau Blaugrana; Attendance: 5,938; Referees: Damir Javor, Borys Ryzhyk, Luka Kardum

=== Round 9 ===
12 November 2024	Fenerbahçe Beko (Turkish Basketball Federation)	87–76	(German Basketball Federation) Bayern Munich	Istanbul
18:45	Scoring by quarter: 13–21, 22–9, 32–28, 20–18
	Pts: Hayes-Davis 25; Rebs: Melli, Hayes-Davis 8 Asts: Hall 7 PIR: Hayes-Davis 28	Boxscore	Pts: Edwards 24; Rebs: Voigtmann, Weiler-Babb 6 Asts: Edwards, Weiler-Babb 5 PIR: Booker 27	Arena: Ülker Sports and Event Hall; Attendance: 12,208; Referees: Emilio Pérez, Joseph Bissang, Guido Giovannetti

12 November 2024	Monaco (French Federation of Basketball)	90–98	(Basketball Federation of Serbia) Crvena zvezda Meridianbet	Fontvieille
19:00	Scoring by quarter: 26–26, 28–22, 20–26, 16–24
	Pts: James, Okobo 20; Rebs: Motiejūnas 8 Asts: Okobo 5 PIR: Okobo 25	Boxscore	Pts: Petrušev 25; Rebs: Kalinić 9 Asts: Kalinić 5 PIR: Petrušev 38	Arena: Salle Gaston Médecin; Attendance: 3,647; Referees: Carlos Peruga, Rain Peerandi, Gentian Cici

12 November 2024	Olympiacos (Hellenic Basketball Federation)	94–92	(French Federation of Basketball) LDLC ASVEL	Piraeus
20:00	Scoring by quarter: 24–29, 18–21, 29–23, 23–19
	Pts: Vezenkov 21; Rebs: Milutinov 7 Asts: Walkup 7 PIR: Milutinov 26	Boxscore	Pts: Maledon 31; Rebs: Roberson 9 Asts: Harrison 6 PIR: Maledon 37	Arena: Peace and Friendship Stadium; Attendance: 9,737; Referees: Saša Pukl, Tomasz Trawicki, Alberto Baena

12 November 2024	ALBA Berlin (German Basketball Federation)	105–101(OT)	(Italian Basketball Federation) EA7 Emporio Armani Milan	Berlin
20:00	Scoring by quarter: 19–23, 24–32, 26–22, 23–15, Overtime: 13–9
	Pts: Procida 29; Rebs: Williams 11; Asts: Spagnolo 9 PIR: Williams 33	Boxscore	Pts: Mirotić 28; Rebs: Mirotić 10; Asts: Dimitrijević, Bolmaro 5 PIR: Mirotić, LeDay 32	Arena: Uber Arena; Attendance: 7,718; Referees: Borys Ryzhyk, Milivoje Jovčić, Aare Halliko

12 November 2024	Panathinaikos AKTOR (Hellenic Basketball Federation)	93–87	(Israeli Basketball Association) Maccabi Playtika Tel Aviv	Marousi
20:15	Scoring by quarter: 21–25, 16–22, 23–16, 33–24
	Pts: Nunn 21; Rebs: Hernangómez 7 Asts: Brown, Sloukas 5 PIR: Hernangómez 22	Boxscore	Pts: Sorkin 21; Rebs: Sorkin 7 Asts: Blatt 8 PIR: Sorkin 23	Arena: OAKA Altion; Attendance: 12,455; Referees: Mehdi Difallah, Carlos Cortés, Maxime Boubert

12 November 2024	Baskonia (Spanish Basketball Federation)	84–89	(Turkish Basketball Federation) Anadolu Efes	Vitoria-Gasteiz
20:30	Scoring by quarter: 21–24, 18–22, 24–19, 21–24
	Pts: Moneke 22; Rebs: Diop 9 Asts: Forrest 5 PIR: Moneke 22	Boxscore	Pts: Bryant 20; Rebs: Bryant, Oturu 8 Asts: Bryant 6 PIR: Bryant 30	Arena: Buesa Arena; Attendance: 8,143; Referees: Sreten Radović, Ioannis Foufis, Jurgis Laurinavičius

12 November 2024	Real Madrid (Spanish Basketball Federation)	98–86	(Italian Basketball Federation) Virtus Segafredo Bologna	Madrid
20:45	Scoring by quarter: 28–25, 25–24, 27–18, 18–19
	Pts: Hezonja 20; Rebs: Deck, Ibaka 6 Asts: Campazzo 9 PIR: Campazzo 27	Boxscore	Pts: Shengelia 20; Rebs: Žižić 7 Asts: Cordinier 7 PIR: Cordinier 25	Arena: WiZink Center; Attendance: 7,549; Referees: Piotr Pastusiak, Luka Kardum, Mario Majkić

13 November 2024	Partizan Mozzart Bet (Basketball Federation of Serbia)	79–87	(Spanish Basketball Federation) Barcelona	Belgrade
18:00	Scoring by quarter: 23–19, 12–30, 23–21, 21–17
	Pts: C. Jones 17; Rebs: T. Jones 8 Asts: Davies, C. Jones 3 PIR: Pokuševski 15	Boxscore	Pts: Punter 18; Rebs: Metu 8 Asts: Satoranský 9 PIR: Parker 22	Arena: Belgrade Arena; Attendance: 19,669; Referees: Emin Moğulkoç, Seffi Shemmesh, Kristaps Konstantinovs

13 November 2024	Paris Basketball (French Federation of Basketball)	83–77	(Lithuanian Basketball Federation) Žalgiris	Paris
20:30	Scoring by quarter: 17–16, 23–20, 22–20, 21–21
	Pts: Shorts 21; Rebs: Hayes 9 Asts: Shorts 6 PIR: Shorts 24	Boxscore	Pts: Brazdeikis 15; Rebs: Butkevičius 9 Asts: Francisco 4 PIR: Butkevičius 19	Arena: Adidas Arena; Attendance: 5,865; Referees: Milan Nedović, Miloš Koljenšić, Anne Panther

=== Round 10 ===
14 November 2024	Maccabi Playtika Tel Aviv (Israeli Basketball Association)	91–94	(Hellenic Basketball Federation) Olympiacos	Belgrade
19:00	Scoring by quarter: 24–29, 29–13, 10–28, 28–24
	Pts: Hoard 20; Rebs: Rayman 6 Asts: Blatt 8 PIR: Hoard 27	Boxscore	Pts: Vezenkov 21; Rebs: Milutinov 8 Asts: Vildoza 4 PIR: Vezenkov 28	Arena: Aleksandar Nikolić Hall; Attendance: 233; Referees: Ilija Belošević, Jordi Aliaga, Uroš Obrknežević

14 November 2024	LDLC ASVEL (French Federation of Basketball)	77–74	(Basketball Federation of Serbia) Crvena zvezda Meridianbet	Villeurbanne
20:00	Scoring by quarter: 24–20, 19–12, 15–19, 19–23
	Pts: Maledon 26; Rebs: Lauvergne 10; Asts: de Colo 5 PIR: Maledon 36	Boxscore	Pts: Petrušev 18; Rebs: Petrušev 7 Asts: Miller-McIntyre 5 PIR: Petrušev 19	Arena: Astroballe; Attendance: 5,005; Referees: Sreten Radović, Saulius Račys, Leandro Lezcano

14 November 2024	Bayern Munich (German Basketball Federation)	115–88	(German Basketball Federation) ALBA Berlin	Munich
20:30	Scoring by quarter: 28–27, 34–17, 34–14, 19–30
	Pts: Edwards 25; Rebs: Booker 5 Asts: Weiler-Babb 11; PIR: Weiler-Babb 28	Boxscore	Pts: Spagnolo 23; Rebs: Williams 9 Asts: Williams 6 PIR: Williams 26	Arena: SAP Garden; Attendance: 10,798; Referees: Oļegs Latiševs, Jakub Zamojski, Adar Peer

14 November 2024	Baskonia (Spanish Basketball Federation)	75–87	(French Federation of Basketball) Monaco	Vitoria-Gasteiz
20:30	Scoring by quarter: 7–24, 17–23, 31–14, 20–26
	Pts: Moneke, Sedekerskis 16; Rebs: Hall 11; Asts: three players 3 PIR: Moneke, Hall 22	Boxscore	Pts: James 16; Rebs: three players 6 Asts: James 7 PIR: James 20	Arena: Buesa Arena; Attendance: 9,049; Referees: Tomislav Hordov, Robert Vyklický, Marko Juras

14 November 2024	Real Madrid (Spanish Basketball Federation)	64–74	(Turkish Basketball Federation) Anadolu Efes	Madrid
20:45	Scoring by quarter: 6–19, 19–28, 24–11, 15–16
	Pts: Campazzo 20; Rebs: Tavares 13; Asts: Campazzo 4 PIR: Campazzo 24	Boxscore	Pts: Bryant 13; Rebs: Poirier 6 Asts: Beaubois 4 PIR: Šmits 14	Arena: WiZink Center; Attendance: 8,434; Referees: Robert Lottermoser, Uroš Nikolić, Eduard Udyanskyy

15 November 2024	Žalgiris (Lithuanian Basketball Federation)	65–72	(Turkish Basketball Federation) Fenerbahçe Beko	Kaunas
19:00	Scoring by quarter: 21–17, 5–26, 21–9, 18–20
	Pts: Walker 19; Rebs: Butkevičius 8 Asts: Francisco 3 PIR: Walker 21	Boxscore	Pts: Hayes-Davis 18; Rebs: Hayes-Davis 11; Asts: Gudurić, Žagars 3 PIR: Hayes-Davis 23	Arena: Žalgirio Arena; Attendance: 15,325; Referees: Juan Carlos García, Josip Radojković, Noam Gordon

15 November 2024	Virtus Segafredo Bologna (Italian Basketball Federation)	77–82	(Hellenic Basketball Federation) Panathinaikos AKTOR	Bologna
20:30	Scoring by quarter: 18–19, 25–27, 15–14, 19–22
	Pts: Clyburn 18; Rebs: Cordinier 7 Asts: Cordinier 7 PIR: Clyburn 25	Boxscore	Pts: Nunn 20; Rebs: Lessort 8 Asts: Sloukas 7 PIR: Lessort 20	Arena: Unipol Arena; Attendance: 8,203; Referees: Damir Javor, Artūras Šukys, Sašo Petek

15 November 2024	Partizan Mozzart Bet (Basketball Federation of Serbia)	81–88	(Italian Basketball Federation) EA7 Emporio Armani Milan	Belgrade
20:30	Scoring by quarter: 22–19, 20–19, 23–26, 16–24
	Pts: Davies, Brown 17; Rebs: Brown 9 Asts: Ntilikina 4 PIR: Brown 24	Boxscore	Pts: Mirotić 19; Rebs: Mirotić 9 Asts: Mannion 7 PIR: Mirotić 27	Arena: Belgrade Arena; Attendance: 18,871; Referees: Miguel Ángel Pérez, Ioannis Foufis, Sérgio Silva

15 November 2024	Barcelona (Spanish Basketball Federation)	87–103	(French Federation of Basketball) Paris Basketball	Barcelona
20:30	Scoring by quarter: 18–31, 30–14, 22–28, 17–30
	Pts: Parker 19; Rebs: Núñez 6 Asts: Punter 6 PIR: Hernangómez 21	Boxscore	Pts: Shorts 24; Rebs: Ward 7 Asts: Shorts 9 PIR: Shorts 36	Arena: Palau Blaugrana; Attendance: 6,103; Referees: Carmelo Paternicò, Gytis Vilius, Amit Balak

=== Round 11 ===
20 November 2024	Virtus Segafredo Bologna (Italian Basketball Federation)	82–86	(Turkish Basketball Federation) Fenerbahçe Beko	Bologna
20:30	Scoring by quarter: 22–23, 16–14, 23–19, 21–30
	Pts: Shengelia 23; Rebs: Clyburn, Shengelia 6 Asts: Cordinier 5 PIR: Shengelia 25	Boxscore	Pts: Gudurić 21; Rebs: Hayes-Davis, Colson 8 Asts: three players 3 PIR: Hayes-Davis 25	Arena: Unipol Arena; Attendance: 7,462; Referees: Miguel Ángel Pérez, Uroš Nikolić, Marcin Kowalski

21 November 2024	Anadolu Efes (Turkish Basketball Federation)	84–93	(French Federation of Basketball) Paris Basketball	Istanbul
18:30	Scoring by quarter: 20–22, 19–21, 19–23, 26–27
	Pts: Thompson, Poirier 15; Rebs: Bryant 5 Asts: Bryant 10; PIR: Bryant 19	Boxscore	Pts: Shorts 21; Rebs: Ward 11; Asts: Shorts 10; PIR: Shorts 26	Arena: Basketball Development Center; Attendance: 8,909; Referees: Saša Pukl, Luka Kardum, Vassilis Pitsilkas

21 November 2024	Monaco (French Federation of Basketball)	103–92	(French Federation of Basketball) LDLC ASVEL	Fontvieille
19:00	Scoring by quarter: 20–25, 18–15, 37–24, 28–28
	Pts: Okobo 27; Rebs: Blossomgame, Motiejūnas 5 Asts: James 7 PIR: Okobo 36	Boxscore	Pts: Maledon 24; Rebs: Lauvergne 5 Asts: Maledon 8 PIR: Maledon 30	Arena: Salle Gaston Médecin; Attendance: 3,370; Referees: Damir Javor, Carlos Cortés, Guido Giovannetti

21 November 2024	Crvena zvezda Meridianbet (Basketball Federation of Serbia)	77–89	(Basketball Federation of Serbia) Partizan Mozzart Bet	Belgrade
20:00	Scoring by quarter: 21–19, 18–26, 16–18, 22–26
	Pts: Petrušev 20; Rebs: Petrušev 8 Asts: Miller-McIntyre 9 PIR: Petrušev 23	Boxscore	Pts: C. Jones 21; Rebs: Ntilikina 7 Asts: three players 4 PIR: C. Jones 27	Arena: Belgrade Arena; Attendance: 20,654; Referees: Mehdi Difallah, Emilio Pérez, Artūras Šukys

21 November 2024	Olympiacos (Hellenic Basketball Federation)	92–69	(Spanish Basketball Federation) Baskonia	Piraeus
20:15	Scoring by quarter: 30–24, 26–14, 17–15, 19–16
	Pts: Fournier 15; Rebs: Milutinov 7 Asts: Fournier 9 PIR: Fournier 24	Boxscore	Pts: Forrest, Howard 12; Rebs: Moneke 5 Asts: Forrest 6 PIR: Forrest 19	Arena: Peace and Friendship Stadium; Attendance: 11,450; Referees: Robert Lottermoser, Piotr Pastusiak, Igor Dragojević

21 November 2024	EA7 Emporio Armani Milan (Italian Basketball Federation)	98–86	(Israeli Basketball Association) Maccabi Playtika Tel Aviv	Assago
20:30	Scoring by quarter: 20–22, 30–21, 29–27, 19–16
	Pts: LeDay 22; Rebs: Mirotić 8 Asts: Mannion 8 PIR: LeDay 29	Boxscore	Pts: Hoard 20; Rebs: three players 3 Asts: Jokubaitis 10; PIR: Hoard 20	Arena: Unipol Forum; Attendance: 7,517; Referees: Tomislav Hordov, Milan Nedović, Steve Bittner

21 November 2024	Real Madrid (Spanish Basketball Federation)	98–84	(German Basketball Federation) ALBA Berlin	Madrid
20:45	Scoring by quarter: 23–22, 32–33, 24–13, 19–16
	Pts: Rathan-Mayes 16; Rebs: Hezonja 8 Asts: Campazzo 10; PIR: Campazzo 25	Boxscore	Pts: Procida 18; Rebs: Delow 7 Asts: Samar 8 PIR: Procida 17	Arena: WiZink Center; Attendance: 7,123; Referees: Joseph Bissang, Seffi Shemmesh, Denis Hadžić

22 November 2024	Žalgiris (Lithuanian Basketball Federation)	84–77	(Hellenic Basketball Federation) Panathinaikos AKTOR	Kaunas
19:00	Scoring by quarter: 28–18, 21–24, 16–21, 19–14
	Pts: Walker 24; Rebs: Sirvydis 7 Asts: Mitchell 4 PIR: Walker 23	Boxscore	Pts: Nunn 19; Rebs: Hernangómez, Lessort 7 Asts: Nunn, Brown 5 PIR: Yurtseven 20	Arena: Žalgirio Arena; Attendance: 14,939; Referees: Carlos Peruga, Rain Peerandi, Hüseyin Çelik

22 November 2024	Bayern Munich (German Basketball Federation)	100–78	(Spanish Basketball Federation) Barcelona	Munich
20:30	Scoring by quarter: 28–21, 20–17, 29–20, 23–20
	Pts: Obst 34; Rebs: Voigtmann 7 Asts: Napier 5 PIR: Obst 30	Boxscore	Pts: Parker 26; Rebs: Satoranský 6 Asts: Núñez 7 PIR: Parker 29	Arena: SAP Garden; Attendance: 10,823; Referees: Ilija Belošević, Milivoje Jovčić, Hugues Thépénier

=== Round 12 ===
28 November 2024	Žalgiris (Lithuanian Basketball Federation)	70–83	(Spanish Basketball Federation) Baskonia	Kaunas
19:00	Scoring by quarter: 17–19, 25–16, 15–17, 13–31
	Pts: Walker 19; Rebs: Butkevičius 7 Asts: Butkevičius, Walker 3 PIR: Walker 15	Boxscore	Pts: Moneke 17; Rebs: Hall 11; Asts: Baldwin 6 PIR: Hall 25	Arena: Žalgirio Arena; Attendance: 15,087; Referees: Mehdi Difallah, Uroš Nikolić, Amit Balak

28 November 2024	ALBA Berlin (German Basketball Federation)	85–103	(Israeli Basketball Association) Maccabi Playtika Tel Aviv	Berlin
20:00	Scoring by quarter: 16–32, 20–20, 20–25, 29–26
	Pts: Spagnolo 16; Rebs: Williams 8 Asts: Williams 4 PIR: Spagnolo 20	Boxscore	Pts: Jokubaitis 24; Rebs: Gabriel 7 Asts: Jokubaitis 6 PIR: Jokubaitis 29	Arena: Uber Arena; Attendance: 4,897; Referees: Damir Javor, Artūras Šukys, Maxime Boubert

28 November 2024	Partizan Mozzart Bet (Basketball Federation of Serbia)	78–70	(Hellenic Basketball Federation) Olympiacos	Belgrade
20:30	Scoring by quarter: 16–25, 22–11, 12–21, 28–13
	Pts: C. Jones 15; Rebs: Davies, Koprivica 5 Asts: C. Jones 8 PIR: C. Jones 25	Boxscore	Pts: Fournier 16; Rebs: Milutinov, Peters 8 Asts: four players 3 PIR: Milutinov 23	Arena: Belgrade Arena; Attendance: 19,815; Referees: Carlos Peruga, Oļegs Latiševs, Rain Peerandi

28 November 2024	Paris Basketball (French Federation of Basketball)	81–78	(Italian Basketball Federation) Virtus Segafredo Bologna	Paris
20:30	Scoring by quarter: 21–24, 23–14, 25–23, 12–17
	Pts: Shorts 19; Rebs: Ward 9 Asts: Shorts 9 PIR: Shorts 25	Boxscore	Pts: Clyburn 25; Rebs: Cordinier 7 Asts: Cordinier 8 PIR: Cordinier 28	Arena: Adidas Arena; Attendance: 6,605; Referees: Robert Lottermoser, Borys Ryzhyk, Alberto Baena

28 November 2024	Barcelona (Spanish Basketball Federation)	90–97(OT)	(Spanish Basketball Federation) Real Madrid	Barcelona
20:45	Scoring by quarter: 17–22, 21–12, 14–20, 22–20, Overtime: 10–10, 6–13
	Pts: Punter 27; Rebs: Veselý 8 Asts: Brizuela, Punter 4 PIR: Veselý 26	Boxscore	Pts: Tavares 24; Rebs: Tavares 18; Asts: Campazzo 10; PIR: Tavares 39	Arena: Palau Blaugrana; Attendance: 7,572; Referees: Saša Pukl, Piotr Pastusiak, Saulius Račys

29 November 2024	Fenerbahçe Beko (Turkish Basketball Federation)	85–91	(Italian Basketball Federation) EA7 Emporio Armani Milan	Istanbul
18:45	Scoring by quarter: 19–24, 18–17, 26–25, 22–25
	Pts: Baldwin 19; Rebs: Şanlı 6 Asts: Baldwin 4 PIR: Žagars 21	Boxscore	Pts: Mirotić 29; Rebs: Mirotić 9 Asts: Mannion 6 PIR: Mirotić 38	Arena: Ülker Sports and Event Hall; Attendance: 12,920; Referees: Sreten Radović, Emilio Pérez, Luka Kardum

29 November 2024	Crvena zvezda Meridianbet (Basketball Federation of Serbia)	101–77	(German Basketball Federation) Bayern Munich	Belgrade
20:00	Scoring by quarter: 25–19, 25–23, 29–10, 22–25
	Pts: Petrušev 25; Rebs: Miller-McIntyre 7 Asts: Miller-McIntyre 12; PIR: Petrušev 34	Boxscore	Pts: Booker 14; Rebs: three players 5 Asts: Edwards 4 PIR: Bitim 12	Arena: Belgrade Arena; Attendance: 19,111; Referees: Miguel Ángel Pérez, Emin Moğulkoç, Ioannis Foufis

29 November 2024	Panathinaikos AKTOR (Hellenic Basketball Federation)	88–91	(French Federation of Basketball) Monaco	Marousi
20:15	Scoring by quarter: 26–28, 22–22, 19–15, 21–26
	Pts: Nunn 23; Rebs: Lessort 11; Asts: Brown, Sloukas 4 PIR: Lessort 32	Boxscore	Pts: Diallo 24; Rebs: Diallo 7 Asts: James 10; PIR: Diallo 35	Arena: OAKA Altion; Attendance: 17,999; Referees: Ilija Belošević, Tomislav Hordov, Miloš Koljenšić

29 November 2024	LDLC ASVEL (French Federation of Basketball)	97–82	(Turkish Basketball Federation) Anadolu Efes	Décines-Charpieu
21:00	Scoring by quarter: 22–25, 25–30, 23–12, 27–15
	Pts: Lauvergne 18; Rebs: Roberson, Maledon 4 Asts: Maledon 7 PIR: Maledon 24	Boxscore	Pts: Beaubois 20; Rebs: Bryant 6 Asts: four players 3 PIR: Beaubois 20	Arena: LDLC Arena; Attendance: 7,917; Referees: Juan Carlos García, Milan Nedović, Vasiliki Tsaroucha

=== Round 13 ===
3 December 2024	Anadolu Efes (Turkish Basketball Federation)	101–90	(German Basketball Federation) Bayern Munich	Istanbul
18:30	Scoring by quarter: 27–22, 29–26, 18–25, 27–17
	Pts: Thompson 19; Rebs: Oturu 6 Asts: Thompson 6 PIR: Thompson 26	Boxscore	Pts: Booker 27; Rebs: Voigtmann 10; Asts: Booker, Edwards 5 PIR: Booker 34	Arena: Basketball Development Center; Attendance: 9,770; Referees: Mehdi Difallah, Carlos Cortés, Guido Giovannetti

3 December 2024	LDLC ASVEL (French Federation of Basketball)	80–78	(Spanish Basketball Federation) Real Madrid	Décines-Charpieu
20:00	Scoring by quarter: 30–26, 21–17, 8–23, 21–12
	Pts: Maledon 23; Rebs: Roberson 7 Asts: Maledon 7 PIR: Maledon 31	Boxscore	Pts: Hezonja 19; Rebs: Tavares 8 Asts: Campazzo 12; PIR: Campazzo, Tavares 19	Arena: LDLC Arena; Attendance: 8,080; Referees: Borys Ryzhyk, Ioannis Foufis, Vassilis Pitsilkas

3 December 2024	Maccabi Playtika Tel Aviv (Israeli Basketball Association)	81–93	(French Federation of Basketball) Paris Basketball	Belgrade
20:05	Scoring by quarter: 18–22, 18–28, 22–18, 23–25
	Pts: Randolph 14; Rebs: Sorkin 6 Asts: Blatt 7 PIR: Randolph 17	Boxscore	Pts: Shorts 22; Rebs: Jantunen 8 Asts: Shorts 8 PIR: Shorts 23	Arena: Aleksandar Nikolić Hall; Attendance: 220; Referees: Emin Moğulkoç, Miloš Koljenšić, Manuel Attard

3 December 2024	Panathinaikos AKTOR (Hellenic Basketball Federation)	90–89	(Spanish Basketball Federation) Barcelona	Marousi
20:15	Scoring by quarter: 25–19, 20–26, 18–24, 27–20
	Pts: Nunn 29; Rebs: Lessort 8 Asts: Sloukas 6 PIR: Lessort 27	Boxscore	Pts: Núñez 19; Rebs: Parker 7 Asts: Punter, Veselý 4 PIR: Núñez 21	Arena: OAKA Altion; Attendance: 16,780; Referees: Damir Javor, Carmelo Paternicò, Luka Kardum

3 December 2024	Partizan Mozzart Bet (Basketball Federation of Serbia)	84–78	(Lithuanian Basketball Federation) Žalgiris	Belgrade
20:30	Scoring by quarter: 22–19, 22–22, 20–23, 20–14
	Pts: C. Jones 19; Rebs: T. Jones 9 Asts: C. Jones 10; PIR: T. Jones 30	Boxscore	Pts: Walker 26; Rebs: Francisco, Smailagić 6 Asts: Ulanovas 3 PIR: Walker 25	Arena: Belgrade Arena; Attendance: 19,366; Referees: Sreten Radović, Juan Carlos García, Robert Vyklický

3 December 2024	Baskonia (Spanish Basketball Federation)	88–76	(Turkish Basketball Federation) Fenerbahçe Beko	Vitoria-Gasteiz
20:30	Scoring by quarter: 26–12, 19–13, 18–22, 25–29
	Pts: Howard 17; Rebs: Hall 9 Asts: Forrest 8 PIR: Sedekerskis, Hall 23	Boxscore	Pts: Žagars, Biberović 13; Rebs: Hayes-Davis 7 Asts: Žagars 6 PIR: Žagars 15	Arena: Buesa Arena; Attendance: 8,421; Referees: Ilija Belošević, Milivoje Jovčić, Michele Rossi

4 December 2024	Monaco (French Federation of Basketball)	80–89	(Hellenic Basketball Federation) Olympiacos	Fontvieille
19:00	Scoring by quarter: 19–22, 26–25, 17–18, 18–24
	Pts: Diallo 21; Rebs: Papagiannis 7 Asts: James 12; PIR: James 24	Boxscore	Pts: Fournier 19; Rebs: three players 6 Asts: Walkup 4 PIR: McKissic 20	Arena: Salle Gaston Médecin; Attendance: 4,633; Referees: Saša Pukl, Jakub Zamojski, Saulius Račys

4 December 2024	EA7 Emporio Armani Milan (Italian Basketball Federation)	101–86	(Basketball Federation of Serbia) Crvena zvezda Meridianbet	Assago
20:30	Scoring by quarter: 23–15, 30–27, 26–23, 22–21
	Pts: Mirotić 23; Rebs: LeDay, Mirotić 7 Asts: Mannion 5 PIR: Mirotić 28	Boxscore	Pts: Yago 17; Rebs: Mitrović 9 Asts: Yago 6 PIR: Yago 22	Arena: Unipol Forum; Attendance: 7,490; Referees: Carlos Peruga, Oļegs Latiševs, Kristaps Konstantinovs

4 December 2024	Virtus Segafredo Bologna (Italian Basketball Federation)	88–90(OT)	(German Basketball Federation) ALBA Berlin	Bologna
20:45	Scoring by quarter: 18–26, 20–22, 23–20, 17–10, Overtime: 10–12
	Pts: Clyburn 23; Rebs: Diouf 8 Asts: Morgan, Pajola 6 PIR: Diouf 22	Boxscore	Pts: Procida 20; Rebs: McCormack 14; Asts: Hermannsson 6 PIR: McCormack 24	Arena: Segafredo Arena; Attendance: 6,104; Referees: Tomislav Hordov, Gytis Vilius, Amit Balak

=== Round 14 ===
5 December 2024	Žalgiris (Lithuanian Basketball Federation)	85–72	(Turkish Basketball Federation) Anadolu Efes	Kaunas
19:00	Scoring by quarter: 27–17, 21–13, 15–23, 22–19
	Pts: Walker 18; Rebs: Giedraitis 6 Asts: Giedraitis 3 PIR: Walker 17	Boxscore	Pts: Bryant 23; Rebs: Willis 8 Asts: Bryant 4 PIR: Bryant 28	Arena: Žalgirio Arena; Attendance: 14,681; Referees: Ilija Belošević, Jordi Aliaga, Eduard Udyanskyy

5 December 2024	Maccabi Playtika Tel Aviv (Israeli Basketball Association)	86–88	(Spanish Basketball Federation) Barcelona	Belgrade
20:05	Scoring by quarter: 16–22, 28–15, 22–27, 20–24
	Pts: Hoard 20; Rebs: Hoard 8 Asts: Blatt 10; PIR: Hoard 26	Boxscore	Pts: Parker, Punter 28; Rebs: Parker, Hernangómez 9 Asts: Satoranský 8 PIR: Parker 24	Arena: Aleksandar Nikolić Hall; Attendance: 164; Referees: Sreten Radović, Sašo Petek, Jurgis Laurinavičius

5 December 2024	Partizan Mozzart Bet (Basketball Federation of Serbia)	91–73	(Hellenic Basketball Federation) Panathinaikos AKTOR	Belgrade
20:30	Scoring by quarter: 20–20, 24–17, 20–12, 27–24
	Pts: C. Jones 18; Rebs: T. Jones 10; Asts: C. Jones 4 PIR: Brown, T. Jones 19	Boxscore	Pts: Sloukas 15; Rebs: Lessort, Hernangómez 6 Asts: Sloukas 6 PIR: Lessort 22	Arena: Belgrade Arena; Attendance: 19,680; Referees: Miguel Ángel Pérez, Piotr Pastusiak, Seffi Shemmesh

5 December 2024	Bayern Munich (German Basketball Federation)	94–80	(Spanish Basketball Federation) Baskonia	Munich
20:30	Scoring by quarter: 23–23, 21–21, 25–17, 25–19
	Pts: Edwards 27; Rebs: Booker, Weiler-Babb 5 Asts: Weiler-Babb 6 PIR: Edwards 25	Boxscore	Pts: Moneke 25; Rebs: Moneke 11; Asts: Forrest 6 PIR: Moneke 31	Arena: SAP Garden; Attendance: 10,780; Referees: Damir Javor, Sérgio Silva, Uroš Obrknežević

5 December 2024	Real Madrid (Spanish Basketball Federation)	70–82	(Turkish Basketball Federation) Fenerbahçe Beko	Madrid
20:45	Scoring by quarter: 20–12, 11–25, 16–23, 23–22
	Pts: Campazzo 14; Rebs: Tavares 7 Asts: Campazzo 6 PIR: Campazzo 19	Boxscore	Pts: Hayes-Davis 33; Rebs: Birch 7 Asts: Baldwin 5 PIR: Hayes-Davis 30	Arena: WiZink Center; Attendance: 9,633; Referees: Robert Lottermoser, Igor Dragojević, Maxime Boubert

6 December 2024	Monaco (French Federation of Basketball)	100–80	(German Basketball Federation) ALBA Berlin	Fontvieille
19:00	Scoring by quarter: 34–18, 21–19, 24–25, 21–18
	Pts: Brown 17; Rebs: Brown 7 Asts: Okobo 5 PIR: Papagiannis, Brown 19	Boxscore	Pts: Wetzell, McCormack 16; Rebs: Williams 10; Asts: Spagnolo 9 PIR: Wetzell 17	Arena: Salle Gaston Médecin; Attendance: 3,349; Referees: Milan Nedović, Marcin Kowalski, Sergio Manuel

6 December 2024	Olympiacos (Hellenic Basketball Federation)	90–96	(French Federation of Basketball) Paris Basketball	Piraeus
20:15	Scoring by quarter: 21–21, 23–28, 16–24, 30–23
	Pts: Fournier 25; Rebs: Milutinov 9 Asts: Walkup 7 PIR: Fournier 34	Boxscore	Pts: Shorts 21; Rebs: Hayes, Jantunen 7 Asts: Shorts 8 PIR: Shorts 22	Arena: Peace and Friendship Stadium; Attendance: 12,327; Referees: Uroš Nikolić, Artūras Šukys, Steve Bittner

6 December 2024	Virtus Segafredo Bologna (Italian Basketball Federation)	87–94	(Basketball Federation of Serbia) Crvena zvezda Meridianbet	Bologna
20:30	Scoring by quarter: 19–18, 19–26, 25–13, 24–37
	Pts: Shengelia 25; Rebs: Clyburn 12; Asts: Pajola 4 PIR: Clyburn 38	Boxscore	Pts: Canaan 26; Rebs: Petrušev 8 Asts: Yago 8 PIR: Canaan 29	Arena: Segafredo Arena; Attendance: 8,029; Referees: Mehdi Difallah, Juan Carlos García, Leandro Lezcano

6 December 2024	EA7 Emporio Armani Milan (Italian Basketball Federation)	92–84	(French Federation of Basketball) LDLC ASVEL	Assago
20:45	Scoring by quarter: 18–20, 23–16, 22–25, 29–23
	Pts: LeDay, Mirotić 17; Rebs: LeDay, Causeur 5 Asts: Dimitrijević 5 PIR: Mirotić 23	Boxscore	Pts: Maledon 24; Rebs: Lauvergne, Ndiaye 6 Asts: Lee 7 PIR: Maledon 27	Arena: Unipol Forum; Attendance: 7,552; Referees: Milivoje Jovčić, Anne Panther, Alberto Baena

=== Round 15 ===
12 December 2024	Fenerbahçe Beko (Turkish Basketball Federation)	69–99	(French Federation of Basketball) Monaco	Istanbul
18:45	Scoring by quarter: 19–17, 19–26, 16–29, 15–27
	Pts: Hayes-Davis 28; Rebs: Birch 9 Asts: Baldwin 3 PIR: Hayes-Davis 30	Boxscore	Pts: James 21; Rebs: Motiejūnas 11; Asts: James, Okobo 5 PIR: Okobo 23	Arena: Ülker Sports and Event Hall; Attendance: 11,055; Referees: Juan Carlos García, Oļegs Latiševs, Josip Radojković

12 December 2024	ALBA Berlin (German Basketball Federation)	90–91	(Basketball Federation of Serbia) Partizan Mozzart Bet	Berlin
19:00	Scoring by quarter: 28–30, 18–21, 18–23, 26–17
	Pts: McCormack 16; Rebs: McCormack 6 Asts: Spagnolo 6 PIR: McCormack 20	Boxscore	Pts: C. Jones 24; Rebs: T. Jones 7 Asts: C. Jones 6 PIR: C. Jones 33	Arena: Uber Arena; Attendance: 9,290; Referees: Emin Moğulkoç, Jordi Aliaga, Sérgio Silva

12 December 2024	Baskonia (Spanish Basketball Federation)	81–82	(Italian Basketball Federation) Virtus Segafredo Bologna	Vitoria-Gasteiz
20:30	Scoring by quarter: 21–21, 17–17, 19–18, 24–26
	Pts: Rogkavopoulos 19; Rebs: Diop 8 Asts: Moneke 4 PIR: Rogkavopoulos 18	Boxscore	Pts: Clyburn 23; Rebs: Shengelia 10; Asts: Pajola 6 PIR: Clyburn 25	Arena: Buesa Arena; Attendance: 8,335; Referees: Saša Pukl, Piotr Pastusiak, Joseph Bissang

12 December 2024	Real Madrid (Spanish Basketball Federation)	83–92	(Lithuanian Basketball Federation) Žalgiris	Madrid
20:45	Scoring by quarter: 19–24, 19–30, 22–18, 25–19
	Pts: Musa 15; Rebs: Hezonja 8 Asts: Campazzo 5 PIR: Hezonja 22	Boxscore	Pts: Walker 21; Rebs: Francisco 5 Asts: Francisco 4 PIR: Francisco 22	Arena: WiZink Center; Attendance: 7,842; Referees: Damir Javor, Miloš Koljenšić, Luka Kardum

12 December 2024	Bayern Munich (German Basketball Federation)	98–93	(Israeli Basketball Association) Maccabi Playtika Tel Aviv	Munich
20:45	Scoring by quarter: 22–30, 21–20, 24–22, 31–21
	Pts: Edwards 25; Rebs: three players 6 Asts: Voigtmann 6 PIR: Napier 20	Boxscore	Pts: Hoard 25; Rebs: Gabriel 8 Asts: Blatt 10; PIR: Hoard 26	Arena: SAP Garden; Attendance: 10,634; Referees: Tomislav Hordov, Moritz Reiter, Michele Rossi

13 December 2024	Anadolu Efes (Turkish Basketball Federation)	93–67	(Hellenic Basketball Federation) Panathinaikos AKTOR	Istanbul
18:30	Scoring by quarter: 20–15, 25–19, 23–12, 25–21
	Pts: Beaubois 16; Rebs: Nwora 8 Asts: Thompson 9 PIR: Oturu 21	Boxscore	Pts: Sloukas 15; Rebs: Osman 6 Asts: Sloukas 3 PIR: Sloukas 20	Arena: Basketball Development Center; Attendance: 9,819; Referees: Carlos Peruga, Uroš Nikolić, Robert Vyklický

13 December 2024	Barcelona (Spanish Basketball Federation)	81–94	(Italian Basketball Federation) EA7 Emporio Armani Milan	Barcelona
20:30	Scoring by quarter: 24–16, 19–24, 17–36, 21–18
	Pts: Punter 21; Rebs: Punter 6 Asts: Satoranský 5 PIR: Punter 24	Boxscore	Pts: LeDay 33; Rebs: Mirotić 7 Asts: Mannion 6 PIR: LeDay 37	Arena: Palau Blaugrana; Attendance: 5,496; Referees: Mehdi Difallah, Milan Nedović, Thomas Bissuel

13 December 2024	Crvena zvezda Meridianbet (Basketball Federation of Serbia)	87–73	(Hellenic Basketball Federation) Olympiacos	Belgrade
20:30	Scoring by quarter: 19–17, 20–21, 28–15, 20–20
	Pts: Nedović 18; Rebs: Dobrić 4 Asts: Miller-McIntyre 9 PIR: three players 20	Boxscore	Pts: Vezenkov 19; Rebs: Vezenkov 10; Asts: Williams-Goss 6 PIR: Vezenkov, Milutinov 21	Arena: Belgrade Arena; Attendance: 20,012; Referees: Robert Lottermoser, Rain Peerandi, Eduard Udyanskyy

13 December 2024	LDLC ASVEL (French Federation of Basketball)	98–93	(French Federation of Basketball) Paris Basketball	Villeurbanne
21:00	Scoring by quarter: 22–24, 27–16, 23–31, 26–22
	Pts: Maledon 22; Rebs: Sako 7 Asts: Maledon 7 PIR: Maledon 30	Boxscore	Pts: Shorts 29; Rebs: Jantunen 5 Asts: Shorts 8 PIR: Shorts 41	Arena: Astroballe; Attendance: 5,519; Referees: Carmelo Paternicò, Gytis Vilius, Leandro Lezcano

=== Round 16 ===
17 December 2024	Monaco (French Federation of Basketball)	93–74	(German Basketball Federation) Bayern Munich	Fontvieille
19:00	Scoring by quarter: 18–24, 28–16, 31–20, 16–14
	Pts: Papagiannis 14; Rebs: Blossomgame 6 Asts: three players 5 PIR: Papagiannis 16	Boxscore	Pts: Edwards 17; Rebs: Booker 6 Asts: Weiler-Babb 6 PIR: Edwards 17	Arena: Salle Gaston Médecin; Attendance: 3,768; Referees: Emin Moğulkoç, Igor Dragojević, Vassilis Pitsilkas

17 December 2024	Maccabi Playtika Tel Aviv (Israeli Basketball Association)	85–95	(Spanish Basketball Federation) Baskonia	Belgrade
20:05	Scoring by quarter: 23–34, 20–23, 17–18, 25–20
	Pts: Sorkin, Jokubaitis 22; Rebs: Jokubaitis 7 Asts: Blatt 7 PIR: Jokubaitis 31	Boxscore	Pts: Howard 28; Rebs: Sedekerskis 9 Asts: Baldwin 5 PIR: Moneke 24	Arena: Aleksandar Nikolić Hall; Attendance: 95; Referees: Robert Lottermoser, Artūras Šukys, Guido Giovannetti

17 December 2024	Panathinaikos AKTOR (Hellenic Basketball Federation)	103–74	(Italian Basketball Federation) EA7 Emporio Armani Milan	Marousi
20:15	Scoring by quarter: 38–15, 24–25, 17–20, 24–14
	Pts: Nunn 39; Rebs: Lessort 8 Asts: Grant 8 PIR: Nunn 37	Boxscore	Pts: Mirotić 16; Rebs: Mirotić, LeDay 4 Asts: Dimitrijević 3 PIR: Dimitrijević 20	Arena: OAKA Altion; Attendance: 17,990; Referees: Juan Carlos García, Saulius Račys, Eduard Udyanskyy

17 December 2024	Paris Basketball (French Federation of Basketball)	85–96	(Spanish Basketball Federation) Real Madrid	Paris
20:30	Scoring by quarter: 17–26, 31–26, 19–18, 18–26
	Pts: Lô 30; Rebs: three players 5 Asts: Lô 7 PIR: Lô 35	Boxscore	Pts: Campazzo 19; Rebs: Tavares 14; Asts: Campazzo 6 PIR: Campazzo 28	Arena: Adidas Arena; Attendance: 6,694; Referees: Saša Pukl, Milivoje Jovčić, Anne Panther

17 December 2024	Barcelona (Spanish Basketball Federation)	90–63	(Turkish Basketball Federation) Fenerbahçe Beko	Barcelona
20:30	Scoring by quarter: 20–12, 24–25, 21–16, 25–10
	Pts: Punter 25; Rebs: Parker 7 Asts: Satoranský, Punter 5 PIR: Punter 32	Boxscore	Pts: Colson 15; Rebs: Birch 6 Asts: three players 2 PIR: Colson, Birch 22	Arena: Palau Blaugrana; Attendance: 5,974; Referees: Tomislav Hordov, Rain Peerandi, Steve Bittner

17 December 2024	Partizan Mozzart Bet (Basketball Federation of Serbia)	79–82	(French Federation of Basketball) LDLC ASVEL	Belgrade
20:45	Scoring by quarter: 21–24, 24–15, 20–27, 14–16
	Pts: Washington 22; Rebs: T. Jones 6 Asts: Washington 8 PIR: Washington 22	Boxscore	Pts: Maledon 21; Rebs: Sako, Lauvergne 9 Asts: Maledon 5 PIR: Maledon, Lauvergne 24	Arena: Belgrade Arena; Attendance: 18,063; Referees: Carlos Peruga, Jakub Zamojski, Tomasz Trawicki

17 December 2024	ALBA Berlin (German Basketball Federation)	66–86	(Lithuanian Basketball Federation) Žalgiris	Berlin
20:45	Scoring by quarter: 10–24, 20–21, 16–24, 20–17
	Pts: McCormack 19; Rebs: Wetzell 8 Asts: Spagnolo 7 PIR: McCormack 25	Boxscore	Pts: Francisco 16; Rebs: Butkevičius, Walker 7 Asts: Ulanovas, Walker 4 PIR: Francisco, Walker 16	Arena: Uber Arena; Attendance: 7,813; Referees: Uroš Nikolić, Carlos Cortés, Vasiliki Tsaroucha

18 December 2024	Anadolu Efes (Turkish Basketball Federation)	89–67	(Basketball Federation of Serbia) Crvena zvezda Meridianbet	Istanbul
18:30	Scoring by quarter: 14–25, 22–17, 23–15, 30–10
	Pts: Oturu, Bryant 17; Rebs: Bryant 7 Asts: Larkin 12; PIR: Oturu 25	Boxscore	Pts: Petrušev 15; Rebs: Bolomboy 7 Asts: three players 3 PIR: Petrušev 15	Arena: Basketball Development Center; Attendance: 7,355; Referees: Miguel Ángel Pérez, Ioannis Foufis, Sérgio Silva

18 December 2024	Olympiacos (Hellenic Basketball Federation)	87–77	(Italian Basketball Federation) Virtus Segafredo Bologna	Piraeus
20:15	Scoring by quarter: 29–17, 14–29, 21–10, 23–21
	Pts: Vezenkov 27; Rebs: Vezenkov 10; Asts: Fournier, Walkup 7 PIR: Vezenkov 38	Boxscore	Pts: Belinelli 20; Rebs: Žižić 7 Asts: Pajola 5 PIR: Belinelli 17	Arena: Peace and Friendship Stadium; Attendance: 10,177; Referees: Damir Javor, Luka Kardum, Jurgis Laurinavičius

=== Round 17 ===
19 December 2024	Panathinaikos AKTOR (Hellenic Basketball Federation)	104–69	(Spanish Basketball Federation) Baskonia	Marousi
18:45	Scoring by quarter: 33–12, 20–23, 23–20, 28–14
	Pts: Nunn 26; Rebs: Hernangómez 7 Asts: Nunn 9 PIR: Nunn 28	Boxscore	Pts: Moneke 16; Rebs: Moneke 8 Asts: Baldwin 6 PIR: Moneke 26	Arena: OAKA Altion; Attendance: 18,320; Referees: Mehdi Difallah, Milan Nedović, Thomas Bissuel

19 December 2024	Real Madrid (Spanish Basketball Federation)	94–72	(French Federation of Basketball) Monaco	Madrid
20:45	Scoring by quarter: 29–22, 24–13, 24–12, 17–25
	Pts: Musa 22; Rebs: Garuba 6 Asts: Musa 5 PIR: Musa 26	Boxscore	Pts: James 19; Rebs: James, Korkmaz 4 Asts: James 8 PIR: James 22	Arena: WiZink Center; Attendance: 7,886; Referees: Tomislav Hordov, Rain Peerandi, Michele Rossi

20 December 2024	Anadolu Efes (Turkish Basketball Federation)	86–77	(Basketball Federation of Serbia) Partizan Mozzart Bet	Istanbul
18:30	Scoring by quarter: 20–27, 13–11, 25–23, 28–16
	Pts: Osmani 25; Rebs: Osmani 6 Asts: Thompson 11; PIR: Osmani 29	Boxscore	Pts: T. Jones 23; Rebs: Davies 6 Asts: Pokuševski 5 PIR: T. Jones 26	Arena: Basketball Development Center; Attendance: 9,430; Referees: Robert Lottermoser, Emilio Pérez, Leandro Lezcano

20 December 2024	Žalgiris (Lithuanian Basketball Federation)	72–78	(French Federation of Basketball) LDLC ASVEL	Kaunas
19:00	Scoring by quarter: 16–21, 20–22, 17–13, 19–22
	Pts: Francisco 22; Rebs: Butkevičius 9 Asts: Walker 4 PIR: Francisco 25	Boxscore	Pts: Maledon, Ajinça 17; Rebs: Roberson 7 Asts: Maledon 6 PIR: Maledon 24	Arena: Žalgirio Arena; Attendance: 15,091; Referees: Sreten Radović, Seffi Shemmesh, Gentian Cici

20 December 2024	Virtus Segafredo Bologna (Italian Basketball Federation)	86–81	(Spanish Basketball Federation) Barcelona	Bologna
20:00	Scoring by quarter: 23–15, 12–19, 30–31, 21–16
	Pts: Cordinier 24; Rebs: Žižić 11; Asts: Pajola, Cordinier 7 PIR: Cordinier 38	Boxscore	Pts: Parker 21; Rebs: Punter 6 Asts: Satoranský 8 PIR: Parker 22	Arena: Segafredo Arena; Attendance: 8,335; Referees: Borys Ryzhyk, Gytis Vilius, Mario Majkić

20 December 2024	Olympiacos (Hellenic Basketball Federation)	90–85	(German Basketball Federation) ALBA Berlin	Piraeus
20:15	Scoring by quarter: 26–19, 18–22, 25–21, 21–23
	Pts: Fournier 23; Rebs: Milutinov, Vezenkov 6 Asts: four players 4 PIR: Fall 25	Boxscore	Pts: Thomas 19; Rebs: Delow 6 Asts: Hermannsson 8 PIR: Williams 15	Arena: Peace and Friendship Stadium; Attendance: 9,789; Referees: Carmelo Paternicò, Miloš Koljenšić, Alberto Baena

20 December 2024	Crvena zvezda Meridianbet (Basketball Federation of Serbia)	81–73	(Israeli Basketball Association) Maccabi Playtika Tel Aviv	Belgrade
20:30	Scoring by quarter: 21–15, 27–18, 12–21, 21–19
	Pts: Bolomboy 17; Rebs: Bolomboy 6 Asts: Yago 7 PIR: Bolomboy 22	Boxscore	Pts: Sorkin 21; Rebs: Hoard 11; Asts: Blatt 9 PIR: three players 19	Arena: Belgrade Arena; Attendance: 15,342; Referees: Oļegs Latiševs, Robert Vyklický, Kristaps Konstantinovs

20 December 2024	EA7 Emporio Armani Milan (Italian Basketball Federation)	78–79	(German Basketball Federation) Bayern Munich	Assago
21:00	Scoring by quarter: 14–26, 25–14, 20–25, 19–14
	Pts: Mirotić 18; Rebs: Nebo 8 Asts: Mirotić 6 PIR: Mirotić 25	Boxscore	Pts: Edwards 25; Rebs: Booker, Voigtmann 7 Asts: Weiler-Babb 12; PIR: Weiler-Babb 25	Arena: Unipol Forum; Attendance: 11,660; Referees: Saša Pukl, Piotr Pastusiak, Marcin Kowalski

3 March 2025	Paris Basketball (French Federation of Basketball)	83–87	(Turkish Basketball Federation) Fenerbahçe Beko	Paris
	Scoring by quarter: 26–16, 19–21, 15–26, 23–24
	Pts: Shorts 22; Rebs: Hayes 7 Asts: Shorts 8 PIR: Shorts 28	Boxscore	Pts: Gudurić 19; Rebs: Birch 7 Asts: Baldwin IV 8 PIR: Gudurić 16	Arena: Accor Arena; Attendance: 8,037; Referees: Ilija Belošević, Jordi Aliaga, Sašo Petek
Note: Originally scheduled to be played on 19 December 2024, the game was postponed due to the home team having insufficient number of eligible players at that time.

=== Round 18 ===
26 December 2024	ALBA Berlin (German Basketball Federation)	69–80	(Spanish Basketball Federation) Real Madrid	Berlin
19:00	Scoring by quarter: 15–28, 19–17, 17–16, 18–19
	Pts: McCormack 15; Rebs: McCormack 8 Asts: Hermannsson 8 PIR: McCormack 21	Boxscore	Pts: Llull 20; Rebs: Tavares 10; Asts: Campazzo 9 PIR: Hezonja 21	Arena: Uber Arena; Attendance: 9,765; Referees: Ilija Belošević, Borys Ryzhyk, Tomasz Trawicki

26 December 2024	Monaco (French Federation of Basketball)	94–75	(Turkish Basketball Federation) Anadolu Efes	Fontvieille
19:00	Scoring by quarter: 22–13, 27–21, 20–20, 25–21
	Pts: James, Loyd 14; Rebs: Loyd 6 Asts: James 7 PIR: Loyd 18	Boxscore	Pts: Oturu 14; Rebs: Poirier 8 Asts: Larkin 6 PIR: Thompson 18	Arena: Salle Gaston Médecin; Attendance: 4,366; Referees: Saša Pukl, Carlos Cortés, Anne Panther

26 December 2024	Maccabi Playtika Tel Aviv (Israeli Basketball Association)	95–78	(Lithuanian Basketball Federation) Žalgiris	Belgrade
20:05	Scoring by quarter: 26–19, 24–19, 21–18, 24–22
	Pts: Hoard 23; Rebs: Jokubaitis, Hoard 5 Asts: Blatt 6 PIR: Hoard 34	Boxscore	Pts: Francisco, Sirvydis 15; Rebs: Dunston 5 Asts: Francisco 9 PIR: Francisco 23	Arena: Aleksandar Nikolić Hall; Attendance: 139; Referees: Emilio Pérez, Joseph Bissang, Uroš Obrknežević

26 December 2024	EA7 Emporio Armani Milan (Italian Basketball Federation)	83–84	(Hellenic Basketball Federation) Olympiacos	Assago
20:30	Scoring by quarter: 19–19, 21–22, 20–23, 23–20
	Pts: Mirotić 16; Rebs: LeDay 4 Asts: Bolmaro 6 PIR: Mirotić 19	Boxscore	Pts: Vezenkov 21; Rebs: Papanikolaou 8 Asts: Fournier, Williams-Goss 7 PIR: Vezenkov 21	Arena: Unipol Forum; Attendance: 12,486; Referees: Tomislav Hordov, Uroš Nikolić, Artūras Šukys

27 December 2024	Virtus Segafredo Bologna (Italian Basketball Federation)	83–69	(French Federation of Basketball) LDLC ASVEL	Bologna
20:30	Scoring by quarter: 17–7, 29–22, 20–16, 17–24
	Pts: Polonara 17; Rebs: Polonara 9 Asts: Pajola 6 PIR: Polonara 28	Boxscore	Pts: Maledon 20; Rebs: Sako 9 Asts: Maledon, Harrison 4 PIR: Maledon 25	Arena: Segafredo Arena; Attendance: 8,756; Referees: Juan Carlos García, Sašo Petek, Josip Radojković

27 December 2024	Bayern Munich (German Basketball Federation)	69–80	(Hellenic Basketball Federation) Panathinaikos AKTOR	Munich
20:30	Scoring by quarter: 16–13, 20–19, 17–23, 16–25
	Pts: Obst 19; Rebs: Voigtmann 13; Asts: Napier 7 PIR: Voigtmann 18	Boxscore	Pts: Nunn 27; Rebs: Mitoglou 9 Asts: Sloukas 8 PIR: Nunn 22	Arena: SAP Garden; Attendance: 10,782; Referees: Sreten Radović, Seffi Shemmesh, Alberto Baena

27 December 2024	Baskonia (Spanish Basketball Federation)	94–81	(French Federation of Basketball) Paris Basketball	Vitoria-Gasteiz
20:30	Scoring by quarter: 28–26, 13–31, 23–15, 30–9
	Pts: Moneke 29; Rebs: Hall 12; Asts: Forrest, Howard 4 PIR: Moneke 28	Boxscore	Pts: Hifi 16; Rebs: three players 6 Asts: Hifi, Shorts 4 PIR: Hifi, Hayes 15	Arena: Buesa Arena; Attendance: 14,204; Referees: Damir Javor, Rain Peerandi, Luka Kardum

27 December 2024	Partizan Mozzart Bet (Basketball Federation of Serbia)	90–81	(Turkish Basketball Federation) Fenerbahçe Beko	Belgrade
20:30	Scoring by quarter: 25–21, 22–17, 18–19, 25–24
	Pts: Washington 27; Rebs: Mike 7 Asts: C. Jones 5 PIR: Washington 27	Boxscore	Pts: Hayes-Davis 19; Rebs: Colson 4 Asts: Hall 8 PIR: Hayes-Davis 26	Arena: Belgrade Arena; Attendance: 19,624; Referees: Mehdi Difallah, Piotr Pastusiak, Robert Vyklický

27 December 2024	Barcelona (Spanish Basketball Federation)	74–78	(Basketball Federation of Serbia) Crvena zvezda Meridianbet	Barcelona
20:30	Scoring by quarter: 15–19, 20–15, 24–22, 15–22
	Pts: Metu 16; Rebs: Metu 6 Asts: Satoranský 8 PIR: Metu 21	Boxscore	Pts: Petrušev 17; Rebs: Bolomboy 9 Asts: Yago, Miller-McIntyre 3 PIR: Petrušev 19	Arena: Palau Blaugrana; Attendance: 6,596; Referees: Emin Moğulkoç, Carmelo Paternicò, Jakub Zamojski

=== Round 19 ===
2 January 2025	Žalgiris (Lithuanian Basketball Federation)	85–92	(Hellenic Basketball Federation) Olympiacos	Kaunas
19:00	Scoring by quarter: 22–18, 30–22, 19–27, 14–25
	Pts: Francisco 22; Rebs: Brazdeikis, Dunston 5 Asts: Francisco 6 PIR: Francisco 21	Boxscore	Pts: Vezenkov 24; Rebs: Vezenkov 7 Asts: Walkup 5 PIR: Vezenkov 27	Arena: Žalgirio Arena; Attendance: 14,923; Referees: Miguel Ángel Pérez, Milan Nedović, Kristaps Konstantinovs

2 January 2025	LDLC ASVEL (French Federation of Basketball)	66–75	(Italian Basketball Federation) EA7 Emporio Armani Milan	Décines-Charpieu
20:00	Scoring by quarter: 19–19, 13–17, 19–15, 15–24
	Pts: de Colo 22; Rebs: Sako 8 Asts: de Colo 3 PIR: de Colo 23	Boxscore	Pts: Mirotić 18; Rebs: Mirotić 8 Asts: four players 3 PIR: Mirotić 24	Arena: LDLC Arena; Attendance: 10,443; Referees: Ilija Belošević, Jordi Aliaga, Jakub Zamojski

2 January 2025	ALBA Berlin (German Basketball Federation)	90–105	(French Federation of Basketball) Monaco	Berlin
20:00	Scoring by quarter: 19–19, 13–17, 19–15, 15–24
	Pts: Thomas, Wetzell 17; Rebs: Rapieque 7 Asts: Spagnolo 5 PIR: Wetzell 18	Boxscore	Pts: James 23; Rebs: Brown, Motiejūnas 6 Asts: James, Calathes 7 PIR: James 25	Arena: Uber Arena; Attendance: 6,857; Referees: Juan Carlos García, Ioannis Foufis, Sérgio Silva

2 January 2025	Baskonia (Spanish Basketball Federation)	73–75	(Basketball Federation of Serbia) Crvena zvezda Meridianbet	Vitoria-Gasteiz
20:30	Scoring by quarter: 16–16, 12–26, 24–18, 21–15
	Pts: Moneke 18; Rebs: Hall, Moneke 7 Asts: three players 3 PIR: Moneke 23	Boxscore	Pts: Bolomboy 16; Rebs: Bolomboy 8 Asts: Yago 6 PIR: Bolomboy 19	Arena: Arena Buesa Arena; Attendance: 12,071; Referees: Robert Lottermoser, Gytis Vilius, Guido Giovannetti

3 January 2025	Fenerbahçe Beko (Turkish Basketball Federation)	84–76	(Turkish Basketball Federation) Anadolu Efes	Istanbul
18:45	Scoring by quarter: 24–24, 19–16, 21–16, 20–20
	Pts: Biberović, Gudurić 17; Rebs: Gudurić 7 Asts: Gudurić 7 PIR: Gudurić 30	Boxscore	Pts: Bryant 19; Rebs: Poirier 6 Asts: Thompson 3 PIR: Bryant 20	Arena: Ülker Sports and Event Hall; Attendance: 11,100; Referees: Tomislav Hordov, Artūras Šukys, Miloš Koljenšić

3 January 2025	Paris Basketball (French Federation of Basketball)	79–90	(Spanish Basketball Federation) Barcelona	Paris
20:15	Scoring by quarter: 19–25, 17–15, 19–25, 24–25
	Pts: Shorts 20; Rebs: Hayes, Malcolm 5 Asts: Shorts 4 PIR: Shorts 22	Boxscore	Pts: Hernangómez 23; Rebs: Hernangómez 10; Asts: Satoranský 8 PIR: Hernangómez 30	Arena: Accor Arena; Attendance: 15,356; Referees: Sreten Radović, Uroš Nikolić, Manuel Attard

3 January 2025	Panathinaikos AKTOR (Hellenic Basketball Federation)	111–90	(Italian Basketball Federation) Virtus Segafredo Bologna	Marousi
20:15	Scoring by quarter: 30–23, 24–19, 25–24, 32–24
	Pts: Nunn, Yurtseven 27; Rebs: Hernangómez, Yurtseven 7 Asts: Brown 7 PIR: Yurtseven 34	Boxscore	Pts: Clyburn 25; Rebs: Clyburn, Gražulis 4 Asts: Morgan, Pajola 6 PIR: Clyburn 33	Arena: OAKA Altion; Attendance: 18,450; Referees: Carlos Peruga, Milivoje Jovčić, Eduard Udyanskyy

3 January 2025	Partizan Mozzart Bet (Basketball Federation of Serbia)	98–75	(Israeli Basketball Association) Maccabi Playtika Tel Aviv	Belgrade
20:30	Scoring by quarter: 27–12, 21–20, 22–15, 28–28
	Pts: Brown 21; Rebs: Bonga, T. Jones 5 Asts: C. Jones 8 PIR: Brown 25	Boxscore	Pts: Blatt 16; Rebs: Rayman, Williams 9 Asts: Jokubaitis 4 PIR: Hoard 15	Arena: Belgrade Arena; Attendance: 19,809; Referees: Emin Moğulkoç, Carmelo Paternicò, Saulius Račys

3 January 2025	Real Madrid (Spanish Basketball Federation)	88–76	(German Basketball Federation) Bayern Munich	Madrid
21:00	Scoring by quarter: 23–16, 24–14, 15–20, 26–26
	Pts: Musa 15; Rebs: Tavares 10; Asts: Campazzo 5 PIR: Hezonja 18	Boxscore	Pts: Edwards 18; Rebs: Booker, da Silva 4 Asts: Booker, Napier 3 PIR: Edwards, Napier 14	Arena: Movistar Arena; Attendance: 9,789; Referees: Damir Javor, Oļegs Latiševs, Maxime Boubert

=== Round 20 ===
9 January 2025	Fenerbahçe Beko (Turkish Basketball Federation)	90–73	(German Basketball Federation) ALBA Berlin	Istanbul
18:45	Scoring by quarter: 16–11, 21–23, 24–26, 29–13
	Pts: Şanlı 18; Rebs: Hayes-Davis 6 Asts: Hall 5 PIR: Şanlı 23	Boxscore	Pts: Procida 14; Rebs: McCormack 8 Asts: Hermannsson 3 PIR: Wetzell 14	Arena: Ülker Sports and Event Hall; Attendance: 7,998; Referees: Carmelo Paternicò, Joseph Bissang, Sašo Petek

9 January 2025	Monaco (French Federation of Basketball)	84–98	(Spanish Basketball Federation) Barcelona	Fontvieille
19:00	Scoring by quarter: 17–25, 24–20, 19–21, 24–32
	Pts: James 23; Rebs: Papagiannis 7 Asts: James 8 PIR: James 24	Boxscore	Pts: Brizuela 27; Rebs: Metu 8 Asts: Satoranský 6 PIR: Brizuela 25	Arena: Salle Gaston Médecin; Attendance: 4,086; Referees: Ilija Belošević, Miloš Koljenšić, Luka Kardum

9 January 2025	Maccabi Playtika Tel Aviv (Israeli Basketball Association)	74–107	(Italian Basketball Federation) EA7 Emporio Armani Milan	Belgrade
20:05	Scoring by quarter: 14–20, 23–25, 17–33, 20–29
	Pts: Sorkin 16; Rebs: Williams 6 Asts: Blatt 5 PIR: Sorkin 16	Boxscore	Pts: Shields 18; Rebs: Gillespie, Tonut 5 Asts: Shields 4 PIR: LeDay 26	Arena: Aleksandar Nikolić Hall; Attendance: 96; Referees: Mehdi Difallah, Carlos Cortés, Gytis Vilius

9 January 2025	Panathinaikos AKTOR (Hellenic Basketball Federation)	96–84	(Basketball Federation of Serbia) Partizan Mozzart Bet	Marousi
20:15	Scoring by quarter: 23–13, 26–25, 26–25, 21–21
	Pts: Nunn 25; Rebs: Hernangómez, Yurtseven 8 Asts: Grant 8 PIR: Grant 33	Boxscore	Pts: Brown 23; Rebs: T. Jones 8 Asts: Lundberg 7 PIR: Lundberg 24	Arena: OAKA Altion; Attendance: 18,612; Referees: Miguel Ángel Pérez, Rain Peerandi, Artūras Šukys

10 January 2025	Anadolu Efes (Turkish Basketball Federation)	76–82	(French Federation of Basketball) LDLC ASVEL	Istanbul
18:30	Scoring by quarter: 20–24, 21–14, 25–23, 10–21
	Pts: Poirier, Larkin 14; Rebs: Osmani 5 Asts: Thompson 6 PIR: Larkin 20	Boxscore	Pts: de Colo 16; Rebs: Black 7 Asts: three players 4 PIR: de Colo 22	Arena: Basketball Development Center; Attendance: 8,987; Referees: Milan Nedović, Anne Panther, Alberto Baena

10 January 2025	Žalgiris (Lithuanian Basketball Federation)	64–83	(Spanish Basketball Federation) Real Madrid	Kaunas
19:00	Scoring by quarter: 26–15, 8–20, 12–20, 18–28
	Pts: Walker 17; Rebs: Smailagić, Walker 5 Asts: Giedraitis 4 PIR: Walker 15	Boxscore	Pts: Musa 17; Rebs: Abalde, Ndiaye 7 Asts: Campazzo, Rathan-Mayes 4 PIR: Musa 18	Arena: Žalgirio Arena; Attendance: 15,034; Referees: Sreten Radović, Seffi Shemmesh, Hüseyin Çelik

10 January 2025	Crvena zvezda Meridianbet (Basketball Federation of Serbia)	85–69	(French Federation of Basketball) Paris Basketball	Belgrade
20:00	Scoring by quarter: 15–25, 24–14, 18–13, 28–17
	Pts: Canaan 15; Rebs: Bolomboy 15; Asts: Miller-McIntyre 6 PIR: Bolomboy 25	Boxscore	Pts: Shorts 17; Rebs: three players 7 Asts: Shorts 4 PIR: Shorts, Hayes 14	Arena: Aleksandar Nikolić Hall; Attendance: 20,990; Referees: Emilio Pérez, Piotr Pastusiak, Steve Bittner

10 January 2025	Olympiacos (Hellenic Basketball Federation)	112–69	(German Basketball Federation) Bayern Munich	Piraeus
20:15	Scoring by quarter: 28–14, 23–23, 27–20, 34–12
	Pts: Vezenkov 45; Rebs: Vezenkov 7 Asts: Larentzakis 7 PIR: Vezenkov 52	Boxscore	Pts: Booker 16; Rebs: Branković 5 Asts: Napier 4 PIR: Booker 14	Arena: Peace and Friendship Stadium; Attendance: 12,349; Referees: Carlos Peruga, Uroš Nikolić, Jakub Zamojski

10 January 2025	Virtus Segafredo Bologna (Italian Basketball Federation)	76–74	(Spanish Basketball Federation) Baskonia	Bologna
20:45	Scoring by quarter: 14–20, 23–18, 22–16, 17–20
	Pts: Morgan 17; Rebs: Cordinier 7 Asts: Pajola 7 PIR: Morgan 21	Boxscore	Pts: Šamanić 16; Rebs: Rogkavopoulos 10; Asts: Jaramaz 5 PIR: Rogkavopoulos 21	Arena: Segafredo Arena; Attendance: 7,319; Referees: Saša Pukl, Borys Ryzhyk, Uroš Obrknežević

=== Round 21 ===
14 January 2025	LDLC ASVEL (French Federation of Basketball)	62–93	(Basketball Federation of Serbia) Partizan Mozzart Bet	Décines-Charpieu
20:00	Scoring by quarter: 20–31, 14–14, 9–29, 19–19
	Pts: Ajinça 14; Rebs: Roberson, Black 6 Asts: Maledon 5 PIR: Maledon, Ajinça 13	Boxscore	Pts: T. Jones 22; Rebs: Koprivica 7 Asts: C. Jones 9 PIR: T. Jones 29	Arena: LDLC Arena; Attendance: 8,215; Referees: Carlos Peruga, Ioannis Foufis, Eduard Udyanskyy

14 January 2025	Paris Basketball (French Federation of Basketball)	88–84	(Turkish Basketball Federation) Anadolu Efes	Paris
20:30	Scoring by quarter: 19–13, 18–26, 22–20, 29–25
	Pts: Shorts 17; Rebs: Cavalière, Shorts 4 Asts: Shorts 8 PIR: Shorts 19	Boxscore	Pts: Bryant 21; Rebs: Poirier 11; Asts: Bryant 4 PIR: Poirier 27	Arena: Adidas Arena; Attendance: 5,540; Referees: Ilija Belošević, Gytis Vilius, Nick Van den Broeck

14 January 2025	EA7 Emporio Armani Milan (Italian Basketball Federation)	100–68	(German Basketball Federation) ALBA Berlin	Assago
20:30	Scoring by quarter: 23–19, 24–24, 31–10, 22–15
	Pts: Mirotić 21; Rebs: Gillespie, LeDay 6 Asts: Bolmaro 8 PIR: Mirotić 28	Boxscore	Pts: Wetzell 13; Rebs: Wetzell 7 Asts: Hermannsson 6 PIR: Wetzell, Hermannsson 11	Arena: Unipol Forum; Attendance: 7,345; Referees: Sreten Radović, Artūras Šukys, Uroš Obrknežević

14 January 2025	Baskonia (Spanish Basketball Federation)	101–102(OT)	(Hellenic Basketball Federation) Olympiacos	Vitoria-Gasteiz
20:30	Scoring by quarter: 17–16, 25–24, 27–27, 20–22, Overtime: 12–13
	Pts: Luwawu-Cabarrot 25; Rebs: Hall 10; Asts: Baldwin 8 PIR: Hall, Luwawu-Cabarrot 22	Boxscore	Pts: Fournier, McKissic 22; Rebs: Fall 9 Asts: Williams-Goss 8 PIR: Williams-Goss	Arena: Buesa Arena; Attendance: 8,198; Referees: Damir Javor, Piotr Pastusiak, Josip Radojković

14 January 2025	Real Madrid (Spanish Basketball Federation)	116–113	(Israeli Basketball Association) Maccabi Playtika Tel Aviv	Madrid
20:45	Scoring by quarter: 33–30, 24–33, 34–27, 25–23
	Pts: Campazzo 31; Rebs: Garuba 6 Asts: Campazzo 8 PIR: Campazzo 43	Boxscore	Pts: Jokubaitis 20; Rebs: Jokubaitis 7 Asts: Blatt 8 PIR: Jokubaitis 27	Arena: Movistar Arena; Attendance: 8,163; Referees: Tomislav Hordov, Uroš Nikolić, Vasiliki Tsaroucha

15 January 2025	Žalgiris (Lithuanian Basketball Federation)	77–68	(Italian Basketball Federation) Virtus Segafredo Bologna	Kaunas
19:00	Scoring by quarter: 25–13, 16–19, 20–19, 16–17
	Pts: Francisco 20; Rebs: Butkevičius, Dunston 5 Asts: Francisco 4 PIR: Francisco 21	Boxscore	Pts: Cordinier 18; Rebs: Diouf 8 Asts: Pajola 5 PIR: Cordinier 27	Arena: Žalgirio Arena; Attendance: 14,464; Referees: Mehdi Difallah, Robert Vyklický, Sašo Petek

15 January 2025	Crvena zvezda Meridianbet (Basketball Federation of Serbia)	91–96	(Turkish Basketball Federation) Fenerbahçe Beko	Belgrade
20:00	Scoring by quarter: 24–21, 19–28, 18–21, 30–26
	Pts: Miller-McIntyre 23; Rebs: Kalinić 5 Asts: Yago, Miller-McIntyre 3 PIR: Miller-McIntyre 22	Boxscore	Pts: Hayes-Davis 27; Rebs: Melli 7 Asts: Gudurić 8 PIR: Hayes-Davis 27	Arena: Belgrade Arena; Attendance: 20,989; Referees: Juan Carlos García, Rain Peerandi, Thomas Bissuel

15 January 2025	Bayern Munich (German Basketball Federation)	95–94	(French Federation of Basketball) Monaco	Munich
20:30	Scoring by quarter: 30–13, 23–27, 25–28, 17–26
	Pts: Edwards 25; Rebs: Voigtmann 4 Asts: Weiler-Babb 6 PIR: Edwards 23	Boxscore	Pts: James 20; Rebs: Jaiteh 5 Asts: James 6 PIR: Strazel 18	Arena: SAP Garden; Attendance: 10,992; Referees: Emilio Pérez, Jordi Aliaga, Guido Giovannetti

15 January 2025	Barcelona (Spanish Basketball Federation)	82–73	(Hellenic Basketball Federation) Panathinaikos AKTOR	Barcelona
20:30	Scoring by quarter: 18–21, 12–17, 29–12, 23–23
	Pts: Parker 25; Rebs: Parker 8 Asts: Satoranský 7 PIR: Parker 27	Boxscore	Pts: Grant 18; Rebs: Hernangómez 10; Asts: Nunn 5 PIR: Osman 20	Arena: Palau Blaugrana; Attendance: 6,523; Referees: Emin Moğulkoç, Jakub Zamojski, Saulius Račys

=== Round 22 ===
16 January 2025	LDLC ASVEL (French Federation of Basketball)	96–89(OT)	(German Basketball Federation) ALBA Berlin	Villeurbanne
20:00	Scoring by quarter: 23–19, 27–21, 20–22, 15–23, Overtime: 11–4
	Pts: Jackson 18; Rebs: Roberson, Sako 7 Asts: de Colo 7 PIR: Jackson 21	Boxscore	Pts: Thomas 20; Rebs: Schneider 8 Asts: Hermannsson 9 PIR: Hermannsson 17	Arena: Astroballe; Attendance: 5,075; Referees: Tomislav Hordov, Uroš Nikolić, Seffi Shemmesh

16 January 2025	Paris Basketball (French Federation of Basketball)	96–83	(Israeli Basketball Association) Maccabi Playtika Tel Aviv	Paris
20:30	Scoring by quarter: 26–11, 23–22, 23–23, 24–27
	Pts: Ward 18; Rebs: Ward 8 Asts: Shorts 14; PIR: Shorts 27	Boxscore	Pts: Hoard, Jokubaitis 16; Rebs: Hoard 8 Asts: Blatt, Jokubaitis 5 PIR: Hoard 25	Arena: Adidas Arena; Attendance: 3,359; Referees: Carlos Peruga, Ioannis Foufis, Gentian Cici

16 January 2025	EA7 Emporio Armani Milan (Italian Basketball Federation)	70–90	(Basketball Federation of Serbia) Partizan Mozzart Bet	Assago
20:30	Scoring by quarter: 17–17, 23–20, 18–27, 12–26
	Pts: Shields, Mirotić 16; Rebs: Mirotić 6 Asts: Bolmaro 5 PIR: Bolmaro 21	Boxscore	Pts: Brown 26; Rebs: Brown, T. Jones 7 Asts: C. Jones 9 PIR: C. Jones 37	Arena: Unipol Forum; Attendance: 9,703; Referees: Robert Lottermoser, Piotr Pastusiak, Amit Balak

16 January 2025	Real Madrid (Spanish Basketball Federation)	86–96	(Hellenic Basketball Federation) Olympiacos	Madrid
20:45	Scoring by quarter: 19–22, 19–25, 16–26, 32–23
	Pts: Hezonja 17; Rebs: Tavares 8 Asts: Campazzo 4 PIR: Tavares 19	Boxscore	Pts: Fournier 28; Rebs: Vezenkov 9 Asts: Vildoza 5 PIR: Fournier 25	Arena: Movistar Arena; Attendance: 10,045; Referees: Saša Pukl, Carmelo Paternicò, Luka Kardum

17 January 2025	Fenerbahçe Beko (Turkish Basketball Federation)	98–86	(Lithuanian Basketball Federation) Žalgiris	Istanbul
18:45	Scoring by quarter: 17–20, 17–27, 28–21, 36–18
	Pts: Hayes-Davis 21; Rebs: Hayes-Davis 6 Asts: Hall 4 PIR: Gudurić, Hayes-Davis 24	Boxscore	Pts: Smailagić 24; Rebs: Smailagić 6 Asts: Walker 6 PIR: Smailagić 25	Arena: Ülker Sports and Event Hall; Attendance: 9,531; Referees: Ilija Belošević, Carlos Cortés, Igor Dragojević

17 January 2025	Crvena zvezda Meridianbet (Basketball Federation of Serbia)	88–82(OT)	(French Federation of Basketball) Monaco	Belgrade
20:00	Scoring by quarter: 13–21, 23–13, 23–26, 17–16, Overtime: 12–6
	Pts: Petrušev 29; Rebs: Petrušev 6 Asts: Kalinić 6 PIR: Petrušev 32	Boxscore	Pts: Blossomgame, Motiejūnas 16; Rebs: Blossomgame, Diallo 9 Asts: James 7 PIR: Blossomgame 24	Arena: Belgrade Arena; Attendance: 19,537; Referees: Miguel Ángel Pérez, Artūras Šukys, Alberto Baena

17 January 2025	Bayern Munich (German Basketball Federation)	72–82	(Italian Basketball Federation) Virtus Segafredo Bologna	Munich
20:30	Scoring by quarter: 18–20, 14–15, 20–22, 20–25
	Pts: Booker 21; Rebs: Booker 8 Asts: Weiler-Babb 9 PIR: Booker 22	Boxscore	Pts: Shengelia 20; Rebs: Cordinier 8 Asts: Cordinier, Shengelia 6 PIR: Shengelia 30	Arena: SAP Garden; Attendance: 10,759; Referees: Sreten Radović, Joseph Bissang, Hüseyin Çelik

17 January 2025	Baskonia (Spanish Basketball Federation)	91–77	(Hellenic Basketball Federation) Panathinaikos AKTOR	Vitoria-Gasteiz
20:30	Scoring by quarter: 22–13, 26–25, 22–19, 21–20
	Pts: Luwawu-Cabarrot 20; Rebs: Luwawu-Cabarrot 7 Asts: Baldwin 7 PIR: Moneke 29	Boxscore	Pts: Osman 16; Rebs: Yurtseven, Hernangómez 7 Asts: Sloukas 11; PIR: Yurtseven 20	Arena: Buesa Arena; Attendance: 11,534; Referees: Mehdi Difallah, Oļegs Latiševs, Miloš Koljenšić

17 January 2025	Barcelona (Spanish Basketball Federation)	90–80	(Turkish Basketball Federation) Anadolu Efes	Barcelona
20:30	Scoring by quarter: 22–24, 26–17, 17–18, 25–21
	Pts: Punter 15; Rebs: Metu 6 Asts: Satoranský 7 PIR: Núñez 17	Boxscore	Pts: Bryant 16; Rebs: Poirier 5 Asts: Thompson 6 PIR: Bryant 18	Arena: Palau Blaugrana; Attendance: 6,343; Referees: Damir Javor, Milivoje Jovčić, Tomasz Trawicki

=== Round 23 ===
22 January 2025	Partizan Mozzart Bet (Basketball Federation of Serbia)	92–86	(French Federation of Basketball) Paris Basketball	Belgrade
20:30	Scoring by quarter: 26–34, 28–15, 20–20, 18–17
	Pts: C. Jones 17; Rebs: Bonga 7 Asts: Lundberg 7 PIR: Bonga 28	Boxscore	Pts: Shorts 19; Rebs: Jantunen, Ward 4 Asts: Lô 4 PIR: Shorts, Ward 19	Arena: Belgrade Arena; Attendance: 19,766; Referees: Juan Carlos García, Oļegs Latiševs, Tomasz Trawicki

23 January 2025	Anadolu Efes (Turkish Basketball Federation)	110–66	(Italian Basketball Federation) EA7 Emporio Armani Milan	Istanbul
18:30	Scoring by quarter: 24–9, 32–22, 31–17, 23–18
	Pts: Beaubois 18; Rebs: Bryant 9 Asts: Dozier 9 PIR: Beaubois 22	Boxscore	Pts: Brooks 13; Rebs: Gillespie 10; Asts: Shields, Dimitrijević 3 PIR: Shields 12	Arena: Basketball Development Center; Attendance: 9,657; Referees: Miguel Ángel Pérez, Joseph Bissang, Jakub Zamojski

23 January 2025	Maccabi Playtika Tel Aviv (Israeli Basketball Association)	85–73	(Basketball Federation of Serbia) Crvena zvezda Meridianbet	Belgrade
20:05	Scoring by quarter: 21–20, 23–12, 23–27, 18–14
	Pts: DiBartolomeo 15; Rebs: Blatt 6 Asts: Jokubaitis 8 PIR: Blatt 23	Boxscore	Pts: Teodosić 15; Rebs: Kalinić 7 Asts: Teodosić 5 PIR: Teodosić 20	Arena: Aleksandar Nikolić Hall; Attendance: 309; Referees: Emin Moğulkoç, Michele Rossi, Sérgio Silva

23 January 2025	Panathinaikos AKTOR (Hellenic Basketball Federation)	89–76	(Lithuanian Basketball Federation) Žalgiris	Marousi
20:15	Scoring by quarter: 17–25, 17–26, 26–19, 29–6
	Pts: Nunn 26; Rebs: Hernangómez 9 Asts: Grant, Nunn 5 PIR: Gabriel 28	Boxscore	Pts: Walker 19; Rebs: four players 4 Asts: Francisco 7 PIR: Walker 13	Arena: OAKA Altion; Attendance: 16,733; Referees: Damir Javor, Jordi Aliaga, Marcin Kowalski

23 January 2025	Virtus Segafredo Bologna (Italian Basketball Federation)	80–86	(French Federation of Basketball) Monaco	Bologna
20:30	Scoring by quarter: 26–18, 23–23, 13–15, 18–30
	Pts: Shengelia 15; Rebs: Diouf 6 Asts: Pajola 4 PIR: Pajola 16	Boxscore	Pts: James 24; Rebs: James 7 Asts: James 4 PIR: James 28	Arena: Segafredo Arena; Attendance: 7,547; Referees: Carlos Peruga, Igor Dragojević, Steve Bittner

23 January 2025	Real Madrid (Spanish Basketball Federation)	90–89	(Spanish Basketball Federation) Baskonia	Madrid
20:45	Scoring by quarter: 22–21, 20–24, 22–22, 26–22
	Pts: Hezonja, Campazzo 22; Rebs: Tavares 9 Asts: Campazzo 6 PIR: Campazzo 29	Boxscore	Pts: Rogkavopoulos 22; Rebs: Rogkavopoulos 11; Asts: Moneke 5 PIR: Moneke 28	Arena: Movistar Arena; Attendance: 9,182; Referees: Ilija Belošević, Milan Nedović, Rain Peerandi

24 January 2025	LDLC ASVEL (French Federation of Basketball)	100–94	(Spanish Basketball Federation) Barcelona	Décines-Charpieu
20:00	Scoring by quarter: 23–21, 25–21, 28–27, 24–25
	Pts: Maledon 18; Rebs: Roberson, Sako 6 Asts: Maledon 9 PIR: Maledon 29	Boxscore	Pts: Punter 19; Rebs: three players 4 Asts: Punter, Satoranský 6 PIR: Punter 25	Arena: LDLC Arena; Attendance: 10,429; Referees: Saša Pukl, Gytis Vilius, Kristaps Konstantinovs

24 January 2025	ALBA Berlin (German Basketball Federation)	84–99	(German Basketball Federation) Bayern Munich	Berlin
20:00	Scoring by quarter: 27–27, 23–25, 18–18, 16–29
	Pts: McDowell-White 18; Rebs: McCormack 8 Asts: Spagnolo 6 PIR: McDowell-White 20	Boxscore	Pts: Edwards 34; Rebs: Edwards, Weiler-Babb 6 Asts: Edwards 6 PIR: Edwards 34	Arena: Uber Arena; Attendance: 12,111; Referees: Borys Ryzhyk, Carlos Cortés, Maxime Boubert

24 January 2025	Olympiacos (Hellenic Basketball Federation)	77–87	(Turkish Basketball Federation) Fenerbahçe Beko	Piraeus
20:15	Scoring by quarter: 21–17, 19–26, 19–26, 18–18
	Pts: Fournier 21; Rebs: Williams-Goss 4 Asts: Williams-Goss 6 PIR: Vezenkov 24	Boxscore	Pts: Gudurić 21; Rebs: three players 5 Asts: Biberović 6 PIR: Gudurić 25	Arena: Peace and Friendship Stadium; Attendance: 12,132; Referees: Sreten Radović, Emilio Pérez, Robert Vyklický

=== Round 24 ===
30 January 2025	Žalgiris (Lithuanian Basketball Federation)	82–97	(German Basketball Federation) Bayern Munich	Kaunas
19:00	Scoring by quarter: 18–22, 13–23, 28–26, 23–26
	Pts: Francisco 33; Rebs: Dunston 7 Asts: Francisco 5 PIR: Francisco 36	Boxscore	Pts: Obst 26; Rebs: three players 7 Asts: Weiler-Babb 13; PIR: Weiler-Babb 34	Arena: Žalgirio Arena; Attendance: 14,678; Referees: Tomislav Hordov, Milan Nedović, Adar Peer

30 January 2025	Maccabi Playtika Tel Aviv (Israeli Basketball Association)	87–93	(German Basketball Federation) ALBA Berlin	Belgrade
20:05	Scoring by quarter: 22–19, 26–27, 15–24, 24–23
	Pts: Blatt 16; Rebs: Williams 6 Asts: Blatt 9 PIR: Blatt 23	Boxscore	Pts: Wetzell 22; Rebs: Schneider 7 Asts: Hermannsson 11; PIR: Hermannsson 25	Arena: Aleksandar Nikolić Hall; Attendance: 292; Referees: Damir Javor, Sašo Petek, Hugues Thépénier

30 January 2025	Paris Basketball (French Federation of Basketball)	91–82	(French Federation of Basketball) LDLC ASVEL	Paris
20:30	Scoring by quarter: 20–15, 34–25, 15–24, 22–18
	Pts: Lô 18; Rebs: Ward 7 Asts: Shorts 6 PIR: Lô 20	Boxscore	Pts: Roberson 20; Rebs: Roberson, Bentil 5 Asts: de Colo 7 PIR: Roberson, Maledon 24	Arena: Adidas Arena; Attendance: 5,500; Referees: Sreten Radović, Jordi Aliaga, Vasiliki Tsaroucha

30 January 2025	EA7 Emporio Armani Milan (Italian Basketball Federation)	87–75	(Hellenic Basketball Federation) Panathinaikos AKTOR	Assago
20:30	Scoring by quarter: 17–16, 22–21, 27–13, 21–25
	Pts: LeDay 33; Rebs: LeDay 8 Asts: Mannion, Shields 3 PIR: LeDay 39	Boxscore	Pts: Sloukas 22; Rebs: Hernangómez 13; Asts: Sloukas 6 PIR: Sloukas 24	Arena: Unipol Forum; Attendance: 10,712; Referees: Carlos Peruga, Milivoje Jovčić, Carlos Cortés

30 January 2025	Baskonia (Spanish Basketball Federation)	88–86	(Spanish Basketball Federation) Barcelona	Vitoria-Gasteiz
20:30	Scoring by quarter: 23–25, 21–21, 21–18, 23–22
	Pts: Moneke 22; Rebs: Moneke 9 Asts: Forrest 6 PIR: Moneke 34	Boxscore	Pts: Metu 14; Rebs: Hernangómez 5 Asts: Satoranský 5 PIR: Metu, Satoranský 18	Arena: Buesa Arena; Attendance: 10,163; Referees: Emin Moğulkoç, Uroš Nikolić, Artūras Šukys

31 January 2025	Fenerbahçe Beko (Turkish Basketball Federation)	95–81	(Italian Basketball Federation) Virtus Segafredo Bologna	Istanbul
18:30	Scoring by quarter: 22–13, 24–24, 23–17, 26–27
	Pts: Gudurić 17; Rebs: Colson 5 Asts: Hall, McCollum 3 PIR: Gudurić 20	Boxscore	Pts: Shengelia 35; Rebs: Shengelia 5 Asts: Cordinier 5 PIR: Shengelia 39	Arena: Ülker Sports and Event Hall; Attendance: 10,990; Referees: Miguel Ángel Pérez, Jakub Zamojski, Alberto Baena

31 January 2025	Monaco (French Federation of Basketball)	77–73	(Spanish Basketball Federation) Real Madrid	Fontvieille
19:00	Scoring by quarter: 20–13, 16–26, 23–17, 18–17
	Pts: Strazel 13; Rebs: Blossomgame, Diallo 6 Asts: Calathes 10; PIR: Calathes 17	Boxscore	Pts: Hezonja 15; Rebs: Hezonja 8 Asts: Campazzo 5 PIR: Hezonja 16	Arena: Salle Gaston Médecin; Attendance: 3,157; Referees: Robert Lottermoser, Piotr Pastusiak, Anne Panther

31 January 2025	Olympiacos (Hellenic Basketball Federation)	92–89	(Turkish Basketball Federation) Anadolu Efes	Piraeus
20:15	Scoring by quarter: 29–14, 18–26, 27–21, 18–28
	Pts: Vezenkov 26; Rebs: Vezenkov 9 Asts: Papanikolaou, Williams-Goss 5 PIR: Vezenkov 34	Boxscore	Pts: Bryant 21; Rebs: Oturu 8 Asts: Larkin 4 PIR: Bryant 16	Arena: Peace and Friendship Stadium; Attendance: 12,349; Referees: Juan Carlos García, Oļegs Latiševs, Kristaps Konstantinovs

31 January 2025	Partizan Mozzart Bet (Basketball Federation of Serbia)	71–73	(Basketball Federation of Serbia) Crvena zvezda Meridianbet	Belgrade
20:30	Scoring by quarter: 18–21, 19–21, 16–13, 18–18
	Pts: Jones 20; Rebs: Davies 8 Asts: Jones, Lundberg 3 PIR: Jones 19	Boxscore	Pts: Petrušev 17; Rebs: Bolomboy, Petrušev 8 Asts: Miller-McIntyre 6 PIR: Petrušev 25	Arena: Belgrade Arena; Attendance: 19,000; Referees: Mehdi Difallah, Emilio Pérez, Saulius Račys

=== Round 25 ===
4 February 2025	Anadolu Efes (Turkish Basketball Federation)	79–73	(Spanish Basketball Federation) Real Madrid	Istanbul
18:30	Scoring by quarter: 25–17, 13–21, 18–23, 23–12
	Pts: Bryant 21; Rebs: Poirier 8 Asts: Thompson 5 PIR: Bryant 24	Boxscore	Pts: Hezonja 18; Rebs: three players 5 Asts: Campazzo 10; PIR: Fernando 14	Arena: Basketball Development Center; Attendance: 9,906; Referees: Tomislav Hordov, Gytis Vilius, Maxime Boubert

4 February 2025	Žalgiris (Lithuanian Basketball Federation)	73–53	(German Basketball Federation) ALBA Berlin	Kaunas
19:00	Scoring by quarter: 25–12, 12–10, 18–15, 18–16
	Pts: Brazdeikis 21; Rebs: Dunston 7 Asts: Francisco 4 PIR: Brazdeikis 22	Boxscore	Pts: three players 10; Rebs: Wetzell 10; Asts: McDowell-White 6 PIR: McCormack 16	Arena: Žalgirio Arena; Attendance: 14,357; Referees: Uroš Nikolić, Joseph Bissang, Michele Rossi

4 February 2025	Crvena zvezda Meridianbet (Basketball Federation of Serbia)	73–66	(French Federation of Basketball) LDLC ASVEL	Belgrade
20:00	Scoring by quarter: 19–18, 17–16, 20–17, 17–18
	Pts: Canaan 11; Rebs: Bolomboy 10; Asts: dos Santos, Miller-McIntyre 5 PIR: Bolomboy 18	Boxscore	Pts: Maledon 13; Rebs: Lauvergne 9 Asts: Maledon 5 PIR: Maledon 16	Arena: Belgrade Arena; Attendance: 20,417; Referees: Oļegs Latiševs, Artūras Šukys, Steve Bittner

4 February 2025	Panathinaikos AKTOR (Hellenic Basketball Federation)	91–90	(Turkish Basketball Federation) Fenerbahçe Beko	Marousi
20:15	Scoring by quarter: 24–24, 17–16, 20–24, 30–26
	Pts: Sloukas 23; Rebs: Hernangomez 8 Asts: Nunn 7 PIR: Sloukas 28	Boxscore	Pts: Hayes-Davis 21; Rebs: Hayes-Davis 9 Asts: Hall 8 PIR: Hayes-Davis 26	Arena: OAKA Altion; Attendance: 18,583; Referees: Juan Carlos García, Rain Peerandi, Kristaps Konstantinovs

4 February 2025	Bayern Munich (German Basketball Federation)	87–70	(Italian Basketball Federation) EA7 Emporio Armani Milan	Munich
20:45	Scoring by quarter: 17–16, 20–20, 31–19, 19–15
	Pts: Giffey, Lučić 16; Rebs: Branković, da Silva 6 Asts: Weiler-Babb 7 PIR: Lučić 21	Boxscore	Pts: LeDay 17; Rebs: Brooks, Ricci 3 Asts: Bolmaro, Dimitrijević 2 PIR: LeDay 18	Arena: SAP Garden; Attendance: 11,039; Referees: Mehdi Difallah, Jordi Aliaga, Saulius Račys

5 February 2025	Monaco (French Federation of Basketball)	92–85	(Spanish Basketball Federation) Baskonia	Fontvieille
19:00	Scoring by quarter: 23–18, 28–17, 16–28, 25–22
	Pts: James 19; Rebs: Calathes 7 Asts: Calathes 7 PIR: Strazel 19	Boxscore	Pts: Forrest 15; Rebs: Moneke 9 Asts: Forrest 5 PIR: Forrest 22	Arena: Salle Gaston Médecin; Attendance: 3,534; Referees: Saša Pukl, Miloš Koljenšić, Mario Majkić

5 February 2025	Virtus Segafredo Bologna (Italian Basketball Federation)	71–81	(Basketball Federation of Serbia) Partizan Mozzart Bet	Bologna
20:30	Scoring by quarter: 23–17, 13–27, 21–22, 14–15
	Pts: Shengelia 16; Rebs: Cordinier, Shengelia 5 Asts: Shengelia 8 PIR: Shengelia 26	Boxscore	Pts: Brown 20; Rebs: Jones 12; Asts: Lundberg 6 PIR: Jones 20	Arena: Unipol Arena; Attendance: 7,967; Referees: Emin Moğulkoç, Seffi Shemmesh, Eduard Udyanskyy

5 February 2025	Paris Basketball (French Federation of Basketball)	73–90	(Hellenic Basketball Federation) Olympiacos	Paris
20:30	Scoring by quarter: 15–30, 16–18, 27–19, 15–23
	Pts: Hifi 19; Rebs: Malcolm 6 Asts: Shorts 9 PIR: Shorts 26	Boxscore	Pts: Vezenkov 23; Rebs: Milutinov 7 Asts: Papanikolaou 7 PIR: Vezenkov 30	Arena: Adidas Arena; Attendance: 8,232; Referees: Carlos Peruga, Milan Nedović, Carlos Cortés

5 February 2025	Barcelona (Spanish Basketball Federation)	100–71	(Israeli Basketball Association) Maccabi Playtika Tel Aviv	Barcelona
20:30	Scoring by quarter: 28–26, 14–10, 32–24, 26–11
	Pts: Punter 28; Rebs: Hernangómez 7 Asts: Núñez 8 PIR: Hernangómez, Punter 23	Boxscore	Pts: Rivero 16; Rebs: Rivero 7 Asts: Blatt 7 PIR: Rivero 21	Arena: Palau Blaugrana; Attendance: 5,297; Referees: Robert Lottermoser, Ioannis Foufis, Gentian Cici

=== Round 26 ===
6 February 2025	Fenerbahçe Beko (Turkish Basketball Federation)	78–67	(Spanish Basketball Federation) Real Madrid	Istanbul
18:30	Scoring by quarter: 16–16, 24–12, 18–19, 20–20
	Pts: Hayes-Davis 20; Rebs: Hayes-Davis 7 Asts: Hall 6 PIR: Hayes-Davis 23	Boxscore	Pts: Campazzo 11; Rebs: Abalde 6 Asts: Campazzo 3 PIR: three players 12	Arena: Ülker Sports and Event Hall; Attendance: 12,360; Referees: Mehdi Difallah, Oļegs Latiševs, Guido Giovannetti

6 February 2025	Žalgiris (Lithuanian Basketball Federation)	87–89	(Italian Basketball Federation) EA7 Emporio Armani Milan	Kaunas
19:00	Scoring by quarter: 16–24, 26–26, 24–17, 21–22
	Pts: Francisco 29; Rebs: Walker IV 7 Asts: Francisco 4 PIR: Francisco 27	Boxscore	Pts: LeDay 26; Rebs: Gillespie, Mannion 7 Asts: Mannion 6 PIR: LeDay 36	Arena: Žalgirio Arena; Attendance: 14,705; Referees: Juan Carlos García, Emilio Pérez, Anne Panther

6 February 2025	ALBA Berlin (German Basketball Federation)	71–77	(Basketball Federation of Serbia) Crvena zvezda Meridianbet	Berlin
19:00	Scoring by quarter: 13–15, 22–25, 20–19, 16–18
	Pts: McCormack 18; Rebs: McCormack 11; Asts: McDowell-White, Rapieque 5 PIR: McCormack 22	Boxscore	Pts: Petrušev 17; Rebs: Bolomboy 7 Asts: dos Santos 5 PIR: Bolomboy, Petrušev 16	Arena: Uber Arena; Attendance: 9,763; Referees: Carmelo Paternicò, Rain Peerandi, Thomas Bissuel

6 February 2025	Panathinaikos AKTOR (Hellenic Basketball Federation)	104–89	(Turkish Basketball Federation) Anadolu Efes	Marousi
20:15	Scoring by quarter: 17–21, 32–26, 26–26, 29–16
	Pts: Nunn 36; Rebs: Hernangómez 8 Asts: Sloukas 9 PIR: Nunn 37	Boxscore	Pts: Thompson 14; Rebs: Nwora 6 Asts: Bryant, Thompson 4 PIR: Nwora 19	Arena: OAKA Altion; Attendance: 18,581; Referees: Ilija Belošević, Uroš Nikolić, Alberto Baena

6 February 2025	Bayern Munich (German Basketball Federation)	76–67	(French Federation of Basketball) LDLC ASVEL	Munich
20:30	Scoring by quarter: 23–18, 15–12, 20–17, 18–20
	Pts: Obst 15; Rebs: Lučić 8 Asts: Edwards 6 PIR: Lučić, Weiler-Babb 15	Boxscore	Pts: Thompson 14; Rebs: Nwora 6 Asts: Bryant, Thompson 4 PIR: Nwora 19	Arena: SAP Garden; Attendance: 10,942; Referees: Carlos Peruga, Sašo Petek, Hüseyin Çelik

7 February 2025	Monaco (French Federation of Basketball)	69–86	(Basketball Federation of Serbia) Partizan Mozzart Bet	Fontvieille
19:00	Scoring by quarter: 18–21, 22–27, 15–14, 14–24
	Pts: Calathes 14; Rebs: Calathes, Diallo 6 Asts: Calathes, James 6 PIR: Calathes, James 13	Boxscore	Pts: Brown 18; Rebs: T. Jones 7 Asts: C. Jones 6 PIR: T. Jones 26	Arena: Salle Gaston Médecin; Attendance: 4,524; Referees: Miguel Ángel Pérez, Carlos Cortés, Vasiliki Tsaroucha

7 February 2025	Virtus Segafredo Bologna (Italian Basketball Federation)	77–83	(French Federation of Basketball) Paris Basketball	Bologna
20:30	Scoring by quarter: 25–17, 21–18, 18–23, 13–25
	Pts: Shengelia 17; Rebs: Cordinier 6 Asts: Cordinier, Hackett 3 PIR: Shengelia 18	Boxscore	Pts: Hifi 23; Rebs: Shorts, Ward 4 Asts: Shorts 6 PIR: Shorts 33	Arena: Unipol Arena; Attendance: 8,611; Referees: Borys Ryzhyk, Milivoje Jovčić, Marcin Kowalski

7 February 2025	Barcelona (Spanish Basketball Federation)	88–90	(Hellenic Basketball Federation) Olympiacos	Barcelona
20:30	Scoring by quarter: 18–22, 29–23, 18–21, 23–24
	Pts: Punter 20; Rebs: Satoranský 6 Asts: Punter 7 PIR: Punter 31	Boxscore	Pts: Vezenkov 24; Rebs: Papanikolaou, Vezenkov 5 Asts: Williams-Goss 5 PIR: Vezenkov 30	Arena: Palau Blaugrana; Attendance: 7,030; Referees: Damir Javor, Jakub Zamojski, Sergio Silva

7 February 2025	Baskonia (Spanish Basketball Federation)	89–82	(Israeli Basketball Association) Maccabi Playtika Tel Aviv	Vitoria-Gasteiz
20:30	Scoring by quarter: 22–23, 29–19, 22–17, 16–23
	Pts: Luwawu-Cabarrot 20; Rebs: Hall 9 Asts: Forrest 9 PIR: Moneke 28	Boxscore	Pts: Sorkin 16; Rebs: Sorkin 6 Asts: DeJulius 6 PIR: Williams 18	Arena: Buesa Arena; Attendance: 7,155; Referees: Sreten Radović, Piotr Pastusiak, Tomasz Trawicki

=== Round 27 ===
27 February 2025	Crvena zvezda Meridianbet (Basketball Federation of Serbia)	80–86	(Lithuanian Basketball Federation) Žalgiris	Belgrade
20:00	Scoring by quarter: 22–23, 21–21, 17–23, 20–19
	Pts: Petrušev 16; Rebs: Bolomboy, Kalinić 5 Asts: Miller-McIntyre, Nedović 4 PIR: Bolomboy 19	Boxscore	Pts: Francisco 25; Rebs: Francisco 6 Asts: Brazdeikis, Francisco 4 PIR: Francisco 31	Arena: Belgrade Arena; Attendance: 20,999; Referees: Miguel Ángel Pérez, Ioannis Foufis, Alberto Baena

27 February 2025	Paris Basketball (French Federation of Basketball)	93–88	(German Basketball Federation) Bayern Munich	Paris
20:30	Scoring by quarter: 23–15, 24–23, 24–30, 22–20
	Pts: Shorts 27; Rebs: Cavalière 7 Asts: Lô, Shorts 3 PIR: Shorts 27	Boxscore	Pts: Edwards 29; Rebs: Lučić 9 Asts: Napier 5 PIR: Edwards 29	Arena: Adidas Arena; Attendance: 8,177; Referees: Damir Javor, Jakub Zamojski, Saulius Račys

27 February 2025	EA7 Emporio Armani Milan (Italian Basketball Federation)	86–80	(French Federation of Basketball) Monaco	Assago
20:30	Scoring by quarter: 18–19, 31–23, 19–19, 18–19
	Pts: Mirotić 22; Rebs: Shields 9 Asts: Shields 5 PIR: Shields 29	Boxscore	Pts: Okobo 16; Rebs: Blossomgame 7 Asts: Okobo 6 PIR: Okobo 18	Arena: Unipol Forum; Attendance: 8,991; Referees: Emin Moğulkoç, Carlos Peruga, Artūras Šukys

27 February 2025	Real Madrid (Spanish Basketball Federation)	96–91	(Spanish Basketball Federation) Barcelona	Madrid
20:45	Scoring by quarter: 23–25, 17–18, 30–24, 26–24
	Pts: Hezonja 19; Rebs: Hezonja 8 Asts: Abalde 5 PIR: Musa 24	Boxscore	Pts: Parra 20; Rebs: Anderson, Parra 7 Asts: Satoranský 4 PIR: Anderson 26	Arena: Movistar Arena; Attendance: 12,130; Referees: Ilija Belošević, Borys Ryzhyk, Miloš Koljenšić

27 February 2025	Maccabi Playtika Tel Aviv (Israeli Basketball Association)	94–76	(Turkish Basketball Federation) Fenerbahçe Beko	Belgrade
21:00	Scoring by quarter: 25–21, 16–25, 31–17, 22–13
	Pts: Sorkin 21; Rebs: DiBartolomeo 8 Asts: Clark III 10; PIR: Sorkin 23	Boxscore	Pts: Baldwin, Hayes-Davis 12; Rebs: Colson 7 Asts: Hall 5 PIR: Colson 18	Arena: Aleksandar Nikolić Hall; Attendance: 150; Referees: Emilio Pérez, Uroš Nikolić, Steve Bittner

28 February 2025	Anadolu Efes (Turkish Basketball Federation)	98–73	(German Basketball Federation) ALBA Berlin	Istanbul
18:30	Scoring by quarter: 24–21, 24–14, 20–20, 30–18
	Pts: Nwora 18; Rebs: Nwora 7 Asts: Larkin 8 PIR: Nwora 23	Boxscore	Pts: Wetzell 20; Rebs: McCormack, Wetzell 5 Asts: McDowell-White 7 PIR: Wetzell 20	Arena: Basketball Development Center; Attendance: 9,794; Referees: Milan Nedović, Piotr Pastusiak, Vasiliki Tsaroucha

28 February 2025	Virtus Segafredo Bologna (Italian Basketball Federation)	70–92	(Hellenic Basketball Federation) Olympiacos	Bologna
20:00	Scoring by quarter: 14–34, 15–20, 25–14, 16–24
	Pts: Cordinier 15; Rebs: Diouf 8 Asts: Hackett, Morgan 4 PIR: Cordinier 20	Boxscore	Pts: five players 12; Rebs: Vezenkov 8 Asts: Fournier 6 PIR: Peters 18	Arena: Unipol Arena; Attendance: 9,071; Referees: Juan Carlos García, Robert Lottermoser, Kristaps Konstantinovs

28 February 2025	Partizan Mozzart Bet (Basketball Federation of Serbia)	86–73	(Spanish Basketball Federation) Baskonia	Belgrade
20:30	Scoring by quarter: 25–18, 20–7, 18–26, 23–22
	Pts: C. Jones 21; Rebs: T. Jones 9 Asts: C. Jones 6 PIR: C. Jones 31	Boxscore	Pts: Luwawu-Cabarrot, Rogkavopoulos 11; Rebs: three players 7 Asts: Forrest 6 PIR: Forrest 14	Arena: Belgrade Arena; Attendance: 16,151; Referees: Mehdi Difallah, Oļegs Latiševs, Gytis Vilius

28 February 2025	LDLC ASVEL (French Federation of Basketball)	93–96	(Hellenic Basketball Federation) Panathinaikos AKTOR	Villeurbanne
21:00	Scoring by quarter: 16–25, 28–29, 19–17, 30–25
	Pts: Ajinça 18; Rebs: Roberson 7 Asts: Maledon 11; PIR: Ajinça 24	Boxscore	Pts: Nunn 24; Rebs: Hernangómez 9 Asts: Nunn, Sloukas 6 PIR: Nunn 27	Arena: Astroballe; Attendance: 5,560; Referees: Saša Pukl, Tomislav Hordov, Michele Rossi

=== Round 28 ===
5 March 2025	Paris Basketball (French Federation of Basketball)	79–91	(French Federation of Basketball) Monaco	Paris
20:30	Scoring by quarter: 22–24, 17–20, 14–27, 26–20
	Pts: Shorts 19; Rebs: Kratzer 6 Asts: Shorts 5 PIR: Shorts 20	Boxscore	Pts: Loyd, Theis 21; Rebs: Theis 7 Asts: Okobo, Strazel 5 PIR: Loyd 25	Arena: Adidas Arena; Attendance: 7,440; Referees: Saša Pukl, Robert Lottermoser, Kristaps Konstantinovs

6 March 2025	Bayern Munich (German Basketball Federation)	100–82	(Basketball Federation of Serbia) Crvena zvezda Meridianbet	Munich
20:30	Scoring by quarter: 20–22, 32–15, 25–18, 23–27
	Pts: Edwards 30; Rebs: Voigtmann 9 Asts: Weiler-Babb 7 PIR: Edwards 29	Boxscore	Pts: Canaan 15; Rebs: Bolomboy 19; Asts: Nedović 5 PIR: Bolomboy 28	Arena: SAP Garden; Attendance: 11,200; Referees: Mehdi Difallah, Gytis Vilius, Robert Vyklický

6 March 2025	EA7 Emporio Armani Milan (Italian Basketball Federation)	76–100	(Turkish Basketball Federation) Fenerbahçe Beko	Assago
20:30	Scoring by quarter: 19–24, 18–29, 19–23, 20–24
	Pts: Shields 17; Rebs: Mirotić 6 Asts: Mannion 3 PIR: Mirotić, Shields 15	Boxscore	Pts: McCollum 18; Rebs: Bango 5 Asts: Gudurić 4 PIR: McCollum 20	Arena: Unipol Forum; Attendance: 10,699; Referees: Miguel Ángel Pérez, Milivoje Jovčić, Luka Kardum

6 March 2025	Baskonia (Spanish Basketball Federation)	66–65	(Lithuanian Basketball Federation) Žalgiris	Vitoria-Gasteiz
20:30	Scoring by quarter: 18–12, 20–18, 10–13, 18–22
	Pts: Howard, Moneke 13; Rebs: Hall 8 Asts: Forrest 4 PIR: Hall 18	Boxscore	Pts: Brazdeikis 17; Rebs: Ulanovas 11; Asts: Francisco 6 PIR: Brazdeikis 19	Arena: Buesa Arena; Attendance: 8,328; Referees: Tomislav Hordov, Borys Ryzhyk, Gentian Cici

6 March 2025	Panathinaikos AKTOR (Hellenic Basketball Federation)	85–70	(Spanish Basketball Federation) Real Madrid	Marousi
20:45	Scoring by quarter: 24–13, 16–20, 23–20, 22–17
	Pts: Nunn 18; Rebs: Mitoglou 9 Asts: Grant 9 PIR: Grant 21	Boxscore	Pts: Hezonja 18; Rebs: Hezonja 8 Asts: Campazzo 6 PIR: Tavares 20	Arena: OAKA Altion; Attendance: 18,940; Referees: Sreten Radović, Emin Moğulkoç, Milan Nedović

7 March 2025	Anadolu Efes (Turkish Basketball Federation)	89–68	(Italian Basketball Federation) Virtus Segafredo Bologna	Istanbul
18:30	Scoring by quarter: 24–24, 15–18, 22–10, 28–16
	Pts: Bryant 21; Rebs: Poirier 13; Asts: Dozier 6 PIR: Poirier 29	Boxscore	Pts: Shengelia 17; Rebs: Hackett, Shengelia 5 Asts: Pajola 4 PIR: Shengelia 22	Arena: Basketball Development Center; Attendance: 9,364; Referees: Damir Javor, Jordi Aliaga, Hugues Thépénier

7 March 2025	LDLC ASVEL (French Federation of Basketball)	95–102	(Israeli Basketball Association) Maccabi Playtika Tel Aviv	Villeurbanne
20:00	Scoring by quarter: 20–20, 31–33, 21–25, 23–24
	Pts: De Colo 20; Rebs: Sako 11; Asts: De Colo 8 PIR: De Colo 24	Boxscore	Pts: Randolph 19; Rebs: Shayok 8 Asts: Blatt, Clark III 7 PIR: Randolph, Shayok 21	Arena: Astroballe; Attendance: 7,876; Referees: Ilija Belošević, Igor Dragojević, Josip Radojković

7 March 2025	Olympiacos (Hellenic Basketball Federation)	82–70	(Basketball Federation of Serbia) Partizan Mozzart Bet	Piraeus
20:15	Scoring by quarter: 27–18, 19–14, 18–19, 18–19
	Pts: Vezenkov 17; Rebs: Milutinov 9 Asts: four players 4 PIR: Milutinov 23	Boxscore	Pts: C. Jones 17; Rebs: Davies 5 Asts: C. Jones 4 PIR: C. Jones 20	Arena: Peace and Friendship Stadium; Attendance: 12,349; Referees: Carlos Peruga, Emilio Pérez, Maxime Boubert

7 March 2025	ALBA Berlin (German Basketball Federation)	85–99	(Spanish Basketball Federation) Barcelona	Berlin
20:30	Scoring by quarter: 20–18, 19–23, 25–25, 21–33
	Pts: Wetzell 15; Rebs: McCormack 5 Asts: McDowell-White 6 PIR: McCormack 14	Boxscore	Pts: Parker 21; Rebs: Metu 7 Asts: Satoranský 12; PIR: Parker 22	Arena: Uber Arena; Attendance: 13,591; Referees: Carmelo Paternicò, Ioannis Foufis, Tomasz Trawicki

=== Round 29 ===
13 March 2025	Fenerbahçe Beko (Turkish Basketball Federation)	92–82	(French Federation of Basketball) LDLC ASVEL	Istanbul
18:45	Scoring by quarter: 30–23, 19–21, 21–16, 22–22
	Pts: Baldwin 15; Rebs: Hayes-Davis 6 Asts: Baldwin 6 PIR: Baldwin 20	Boxscore	Pts: Lauvergne 20; Rebs: Lauvergne 9 Asts: de Colo 11; PIR: de Colo 27	Arena: Ülker Sports and Event Hall; Attendance: 8,315; Referees: Robert Lottermoser, Milan Nedović, Uroš Obrknežević

13 March 2025	Crvena zvezda Meridianbet (Basketball Federation of Serbia)	80–82	(Italian Basketball Federation) EA7 Emporio Armani Milan	Belgrade
19:00	Scoring by quarter: 24–23, 21–25, 19–20, 16–14
	Pts: Kalinić, Nedović 12; Rebs: Kalinić 8 Asts: Nedović 5 PIR: Kalinić 19	Boxscore	Pts: Mirotić 19; Rebs: Mirotić 7 Asts: Mannion 5 PIR: Mirotić, Shields 22	Arena: Belgrade Arena; Attendance: 18,143; Referees: Emilio Pérez, Oļegs Latiševs, Saulius Račys

13 March 2025	Žalgiris (Lithuanian Basketball Federation)	83–81	(French Federation of Basketball) Paris Basketball	Kaunas
19:00	Scoring by quarter: 14–22, 17–25, 29–14, 23–20
	Pts: Brazdeikis 16; Rebs: Birutis 8 Asts: Francisco 8 PIR: Francisco 24	Boxscore	Pts: Shorts 21; Rebs: Jantunen 5 Asts: Malcolm, Shorts 4 PIR: Hifi 22	Arena: Žalgirio Arena; Attendance: 15,056; Referees: Carlos Peruga, Milivoje Jovčić, Igor Dragojević

13 March 2025	ALBA Berlin (German Basketball Federation)	97–90	(Spanish Basketball Federation) Baskonia	Berlin
20:00	Scoring by quarter: 26–24, 24–22, 25–23, 22–21
	Pts: Thomas 21; Rebs: Baker 7 Asts: McDowell-White 7 PIR: Procida, Thomas 16	Boxscore	Pts: Rogkavopoulos 17; Rebs: Diop 8 Asts: Sedekerskis 5 PIR: Rogkavopoulos 21	Arena: Uber Arena; Attendance: 7,068; Referees: Saša Pukl, Seffi Shemmesh, Guido Giovannetti

13 March 2025	Maccabi Playtika Tel Aviv (Israeli Basketball Association)	91–88	(French Federation of Basketball) Monaco	Belgrade
20:05	Scoring by quarter: 21–18, 18–24, 20–21, 32–25
	Pts: Jokubaitis, Sorkin 18; Rebs: Williams 11; Asts: Jokubaitis 5 PIR: Randolph 24	Boxscore	Pts: James 26; Rebs: Jaiteh 11; Asts: James 8 PIR: Theis 25	Arena: Aleksandar Nikolić Hall; Attendance: 158; Referees: Sreten Radović, Juan Carlos García, Marko Juras

13 March 2025	Virtus Segafredo Bologna (Italian Basketball Federation)	67–80	(Spanish Basketball Federation) Real Madrid	Bologna
20:45	Scoring by quarter: 17–30, 16–20, 21–18, 13–12
	Pts: Morgan 11; Rebs: Shengelia 7 Asts: Cordinier, Morgan 4 PIR: Shengelia 13	Boxscore	Pts: Musa, Tavares 13; Rebs: Hezonja 6 Asts: Campazzo 7 PIR: Musa 16	Arena: Unipol Arena; Attendance: 7,121; Referees: Mehdi Difallah, Tomislav Hordov, Artūras Šukys

14 March 2025	Olympiacos (Hellenic Basketball Federation)	76–74	(Hellenic Basketball Federation) Panathinaikos AKTOR	Piraeus
20:15	Scoring by quarter: 20–9, 18–18, 24–23, 14–24
	Pts: Vezenkov 18; Rebs: Vezenkov 9 Asts: Vezenkov 5 PIR: Vezenkov 24	Boxscore	Pts: Mitoglou 18; Rebs: Hernangómez 6 Asts: Brown, Sloukas 6 PIR: Mitoglou 20	Arena: Peace and Friendship Stadium; Attendance: 12,349; Referees: Damir Javor, Uroš Nikolić, Jakub Zamojski

14 March 2025	Bayern Munich (German Basketball Federation)	92–97	(Turkish Basketball Federation) Anadolu Efes	Munich
20:30	Scoring by quarter: 17–26, 20–25, 30–14, 25–32
	Pts: Edwards, Weiler-Babb 18; Rebs: Voigtmann 7 Asts: Edwards 7 PIR: Voigtmann 25	Boxscore	Pts: Larkin 25; Rebs: Poirier 9 Asts: Bryant 6 PIR: Larkin 33	Arena: SAP Garden; Attendance: 11,200; Referees: Ilija Belošević, Carmelo Paternicò, Marcin Kowalski

14 March 2025	Barcelona (Spanish Basketball Federation)	87–80	(Basketball Federation of Serbia) Partizan Mozzart Bet	Barcelona
20:45	Scoring by quarter: 25–32, 29–9, 19–26, 14–13
	Pts: Punter 25; Rebs: Hernangómez 8 Asts: Punter 4 PIR: Punter 29	Boxscore	Pts: Brown, Mike 16; Rebs: T. Jones 9 Asts: C. Jones 9 PIR: Mike 19	Arena: Palau Blaugrana; Attendance: 6,551; Referees: Emin Moğulkoç, Piotr Pastusiak, Rain Peerandi

=== Round 30 ===
18 March 2025	Paris Basketball (French Federation of Basketball)	92–79	(Italian Basketball Federation) EA7 Emporio Armani Milan	Paris
20:30	Scoring by quarter: 22–18, 26–19, 28–30, 16–12
	Pts: Shorts 24; Rebs: Ward 7 Asts: Shorts 10; PIR: Shorts 37	Boxscore	Pts: Causeur 18; Rebs: Shields 9 Asts: Tonut 3 PIR: LeDay 19	Arena: Adidas Arena; Attendance: 8,421; Referees: Juan Carlos García, Milan Nedović, Carlos Cortes

20 March 2025	Olympiacos (Hellenic Basketball Federation)	73–81	(Basketball Federation of Serbia) Crvena zvezda Meridianbet	Piraeus
19:00	Scoring by quarter: 8–20, 19–23, 28–15, 18–23
	Pts: Vezenkov 19; Rebs: Vezenkov 9 Asts: Lee 6 PIR: McKissic 26	Boxscore	Pts: Giedraitis 20; Rebs: Miller-McIntyre 11; Asts: Nedović 6 PIR: Giedraitis 28	Arena: Peace and Friendship Stadium; Attendance: 11,997; Referees: Miguel Ángel Pérez, Carmelo Paternicò, Jordi Aliaga

20 March 2025	Monaco (French Federation of Basketball)	91–82	(Turkish Basketball Federation) Fenerbahçe Beko	Fontvieille
19:00	Scoring by quarter: 26–28, 21–15, 16–15, 28–24
	Pts: James 29; Rebs: Theis 7 Asts: James, Okobo 6 PIR: James 26	Boxscore	Pts: McCollum 24; Rebs: Hayes-Davis 7 Asts: Gudurić 6 PIR: Gudurić 24	Arena: Salle Gaston Médecin; Attendance: 4,156; Referees: Carlos Peruga, Piotr Pastusiak, Miloš Koljenšić

20 March 2025	Maccabi Playtika Tel Aviv (Israeli Basketball Association)	77–67	(Italian Basketball Federation) Virtus Segafredo Bologna	Belgrade
20:15	Scoring by quarter: 15–17, 27–16, 23–12, 12–22
	Pts: Jokubaitis 19; Rebs: Williams 10; Asts: Blatt 6 PIR: Jokubaitis 24	Boxscore	Pts: Polonara 15; Rebs: Žižić 12; Asts: Pajola 4 PIR: Clyburn, Polonara, Žižić 15	Arena: Aleksandar Nikolić Hall; Attendance: 135; Referees: Emin Moğulkoç, Oļegs Latiševs, Robert Vyklický

20 March 2025	Baskonia (Spanish Basketball Federation)	112–89	(German Basketball Federation) Bayern Munich	Vitoria-Gasteiz
20:30	Scoring by quarter: 25–21, 25–27, 33–23, 29–18
	Pts: Howard 27; Rebs: Sedekerskis 9 Asts: Forrest 10; PIR: Howard 26	Boxscore	Pts: Napier 15; Rebs: Voigtmann 6 Asts: Edwards 7 PIR: Napier, Voigtmann 16	Arena: Buesa Arena; Attendance: 8,252; Referees: Milan Nedović, Artūras Šukys, Maxime Boubert

20 March 2025	Real Madrid (Spanish Basketball Federation)	81–70	(French Federation of Basketball) LDLC ASVEL	Madrid
20:45	Scoring by quarter: 32–10, 20–24, 16–19, 13–17
	Pts: Tavares 23; Rebs: Hezonja 5 Asts: Hezonja 4 PIR: Tavares 28	Boxscore	Pts: Maledon 25; Rebs: Roberson 6 Asts: Maledon 5 PIR: Maledon 35	Arena: Movistar Arena; Attendance: 7,767; Referees: Damir Javor, Saulius Račys, Mario Majkić

21 March 2025	Panathinaikos AKTOR (Hellenic Basketball Federation)	91–81	(German Basketball Federation) ALBA Berlin	Marousi
20:15	Scoring by quarter: 23–19, 23–16, 20–29, 25–17
	Pts: Grant 19; Rebs: Gabriel, Hernangómez 8 Asts: Nunn 3 PIR: Grant 27	Boxscore	Pts: Thomas 14; Rebs: Olinde 6 Asts: McDowell-White 6 PIR: Thomas 20	Arena: OAKA Altion; Attendance: 17,850; Referees: Ilija Belošević, Tomislav Hordov, Hüseyin Çelik

21 March 2025	Barcelona (Spanish Basketball Federation)	82–70	(Lithuanian Basketball Federation) Žalgiris	Barcelona
20:30	Scoring by quarter: 16–20, 20–11, 23–20, 23–19
	Pts: Brizuela 20; Rebs: Metu 8 Asts: three players 3 PIR: Anderson 24	Boxscore	Pts: three players 13; Rebs: Ulanovas 7 Asts: Francisco 5 PIR: Brazdeikis 15	Arena: Palau Blaugrana; Attendance: 6,443; Referees: Ilija Belošević, Tomislav Hordov, Hüseyin Çelik

21 March 2025	Partizan Mozzart Bet (Basketball Federation of Serbia)	65–97	(Turkish Basketball Federation) Anadolu Efes	Belgrade
20:45	Scoring by quarter: 18–24, 15–30, 12–19, 20–24
	Pts: three players 11; Rebs: Davies, C. Jones 5 Asts: C. Jones 3 PIR: T. Jones 12	Boxscore	Pts: Thompson 19; Rebs: three players 5 Asts: Osmani 4 PIR: Thompson 25	Arena: Belgrade Arena; Attendance: 20,073; Referees: Mehdi Difallah, Ioannis Foufis, Gytis Vilius

=== Round 31 ===
25 March 2025	Fenerbahçe Beko (Turkish Basketball Federation)	101–100	(French Federation of Basketball) Paris Basketball	Istanbul
18:45	Scoring by quarter: 17–24, 27–27, 27–33, 30–16
	Pts: Gudurić 25; Rebs: McCollum 5 Asts: Baldwin IV 5 PIR: McCollum 24	Boxscore	Pts: Hifi, Shorts 19; Rebs: Jantunen, Ward 8 Asts: Shorts 10; PIR: three players 19	Arena: Ülker Sports and Event Hall; Attendance: 9,217; Referees: Miguel Ángel Pérez, Ioannis Foufis, Alberto Baena

25 March 2025	Monaco (French Federation of Basketball)	96–86(OT)	(Lithuanian Basketball Federation) Žalgiris	Fontvieille
19:00	Scoring by quarter: 15–23, 29–25, 14–17, 22–15, Overtime: 16–6
	Pts: James 22; Rebs: Blossomgame 10; Asts: four players 3 PIR: James, Theis 26	Boxscore	Pts: Francisco 19; Rebs: Butkevičius 8 Asts: Francisco 5 PIR: Brazdeikis 16	Arena: Salle Gaston Médecin; Attendance: 4,148; Referees: Ilija Belošević, Uroš Nikolić, Eduard Udyanskyy

25 March 2025	Barcelona (Spanish Basketball Federation)	101–102	(German Basketball Federation) Bayern Munich	Barcelona
20:30	Scoring by quarter: 28–30, 27–26, 22–20, 24–26
	Pts: Parker 23; Rebs: Hernangómez 14; Asts: Satoranský 6 PIR: Hernangómez 24	Boxscore	Pts: Edwards 23; Rebs: Voigtmann 5 Asts: Edwards 5 PIR: Edwards 21	Arena: Palau Blaugrana; Attendance: 6,266; Referees: Mehdi Difallah, Oļegs Latiševs, Tomasz Trawicki

25 March 2025	Real Madrid (Spanish Basketball Federation)	96–86	(Italian Basketball Federation) EA7 Emporio Armani Milan	Madrid
20:45	Scoring by quarter: 31–16, 23–25, 24–22, 18–26
	Pts: Musa 21; Rebs: Tavares 7 Asts: Campazzo 6 PIR: Tavares 27	Boxscore	Pts: LeDay 15; Rebs: Causeur, Mirotić 4 Asts: Mirotić 5 PIR: Shields 20	Arena: Movistar Arena; Attendance: 9,544; Referees: Emin Moğulkoç, Piotr Pastusiak, Igor Dragojević

25 March 2025	Partizan Mozzart Bet (Basketball Federation of Serbia)	85–71	(German Basketball Federation) ALBA Berlin	Belgrade
20:45	Scoring by quarter: 13–14, 27–20, 21–22, 24–15
	Pts: Davies 22; Rebs: Brown 7 Asts: C. Jones 9 PIR: Davies 28	Boxscore	Pts: Thomas 16; Rebs: Schneider 6 Asts: Hermannsson 13; PIR: Thomas 15	Arena: Belgrade Arena; Attendance: 18,804; Referees: Carmelo Paternicò, Saulius Račys, Marcin Kowalski

25 March 2025	LDLC ASVEL (French Federation of Basketball)	81–70	(Hellenic Basketball Federation) Olympiacos	Astroballe
20:45	Scoring by quarter: 14–16, 23–23, 21–13, 23–18
	Pts: Maledon 23; Rebs: Sako 7 Asts: Maledon 5 PIR: Maledon 28	Boxscore	Pts: Fournier, Vezenkov 25; Rebs: Vezenkov 10; Asts: Lee 4 PIR: Vezenkov 36	Arena: Villeurbanne; Attendance: 11,782; Referees: Sreten Radović, Rain Peerandi, Anne Panther

26 March 2025	Anadolu Efes (Turkish Basketball Federation)	92–76	(Spanish Basketball Federation) Baskonia	Istanbul
18:30	Scoring by quarter: 28–22, 21–22, 18–15, 25–17
	Pts: Beaubois 18; Rebs: four players 6 Asts: Bryant 8 PIR: Poirier 22	Boxscore	Pts: Forrest 17; Rebs: Luwawu-Cabarrot 6 Asts: Forrest 7 PIR: Howard 19	Arena: Basketball Development Center; Attendance: 6,688; Referees: Robert Lottermoser, Milivoje Jovčić, Steve Bittner

26 March 2025	Crvena zvezda Meridianbet (Basketball Federation of Serbia)	88–52	(Italian Basketball Federation) Virtus Segafredo Bologna	Belgrade
20:00	Scoring by quarter: 28–11, 23–16, 18–10, 19–15
	Pts: Davidovac 17; Rebs: Giedraitis, Miller-McIntyre 6 Asts: Petrušev, Teodosić 6 PIR: Petrušev 24	Boxscore	Pts: Shengelia 13; Rebs: Holiday 6 Asts: Cordinier, Pajola 4 PIR: Shengelia 16	Arena: Belgrade Arena; Attendance: 20,644; Referees: Carlos Peruga, Seffi Shemmesh, Thomas Bissuel

26 March 2025	Maccabi Playtika Tel Aviv (Israeli Basketball Association)	92–99	(Hellenic Basketball Federation) Panathinaikos AKTOR	Belgrade
20:05	Scoring by quarter: 19–24, 28–18, 31–25, 14–32
	Pts: Randolph 21; Rebs: Williams 7 Asts: Blatt, Jokubaitis 4 PIR: Randolph 25	Boxscore	Pts: Nunn 26; Rebs: Hernangómez 8 Asts: Nunn 8 PIR: Nunn 34	Arena: Aleksandar Nikolić Hall; Attendance: 180; Referees: Emilio Pérez, Joseph Bissang, Uroš Obrknežević

=== Round 32 ===
27 March 2025	LDLC ASVEL (French Federation of Basketball)	88–79	(Lithuanian Basketball Federation) Žalgiris	Villeurbanne
20:00	Scoring by quarter: 23–18, 17–16, 23–27, 25–18
	Pts: Maledon 19; Rebs: Roberson 6 Asts: Maledon 6 PIR: Maledon 20	Boxscore	Pts: Francisco 19; Rebs: Birutis 8 Asts: Francisco 8 PIR: Francisco 26	Arena: Astroballe; Attendance: 5,560; Referees: Juan Carlos García, Sérgio Silva, Adar Peer

27 March 2025	Olympiacos (Hellenic Basketball Federation)	77–80	(French Federation of Basketball) Monaco	Piraeus
20:15	Scoring by quarter: 15–23, 22–12, 23–23, 17–22
	Pts: Vezenkov 21; Rebs: Vezenkov 6 Asts: Fournier 5 PIR: Vezenkov 24	Boxscore	Pts: Blossomgame 18; Rebs: Theis 6 Asts: James 12; PIR: James 23	Arena: Peace and Friendship Stadium; Attendance: 12,077; Referees: Tomislav Hordov, Oļegs Latiševs, Sašo Petek

27 March 2025	Bayern Munich (German Basketball Federation)	89–74	(Basketball Federation of Serbia) Partizan Mozzart Bet	Munich
20:30	Scoring by quarter: 21–23, 21–21, 23–19, 24–11
	Pts: Edwards 25; Rebs: Napier, Weiler-Babb 5 Asts: Napier 6 PIR: Edwards 22	Boxscore	Pts: C. Jones 19; Rebs: T. Jones 6 Asts: C. Jones 10; PIR: C. Jones 24	Arena: SAP Garden; Attendance: 11,200; Referees: Miguel Ángel Pérez, Jordi Aliaga, Guido Giovannetti

27 March 2025	EA7 Emporio Armani Milan (Italian Basketball Federation)	88–98	(Spanish Basketball Federation) Barcelona	Assago
20:30	Scoring by quarter: 21–25, 23–30, 19–19, 25–24
	Pts: Mirotić 28; Rebs: Mirotić 9 Asts: Mannion 8 PIR: Mirotić 32	Boxscore	Pts: Brizuela 27; Rebs: Parra 7 Asts: four players 3 PIR: Brizuela 25	Arena: Unipol Forum; Attendance: 10,742; Referees: Ilija Belošević, Luka Kardum, Eduard Udyanskyy

28 March 2025	Anadolu Efes (Turkish Basketball Federation)	90–88	(Israeli Basketball Association) Maccabi Playtika Tel Aviv	Riga
18:30	Scoring by quarter: 26–22, 24–24, 16–19, 24–23
	Pts: Bryant 25; Rebs: Poirier 4 Asts: Bryant 6 PIR: Bryant 28	Boxscore	Pts: Sorkin 22; Rebs: Rayman 7 Asts: Blatt 6 PIR: Sorkin 27	Arena: Xiaomi Arena; Attendance: 4,412; Referees: Saša Pukl, Carlos Cortés, Vassilis Pitsilkas

28 March 2025	Fenerbahçe Beko (Turkish Basketball Federation)	82–77	(Spanish Basketball Federation) Baskonia	Istanbul
18:45	Scoring by quarter: 19–13, 27–19, 26–27, 10–18
	Pts: Hayes-Davis 17; Rebs: Melli 9 Asts: Baldwin IV 5 PIR: Hayes-Davis 22	Boxscore	Pts: Rogkavopoulos 14; Rebs: Sedekerskis 6 Asts: Forrest 12; PIR: Forrest 23	Arena: Ülker Sports and Event Hall; Attendance: 8,315; Referees: Mehdi Difallah, Uroš Nikolić, Vasiliki Tsaroucha

28 March 2025	Crvena zvezda Meridianbet (Basketball Federation of Serbia)	72–78	(Spanish Basketball Federation) Real Madrid	Belgrade
20:00	Scoring by quarter: 9–22, 18–20, 18–13, 27–23
	Pts: Miller-McIntyre 17; Rebs: three players 7 Asts: Kalinić 5 PIR: Miller-McIntyre 24	Boxscore	Pts: Tavares 14; Rebs: Tavares 10; Asts: Campazzo, Llull 5 PIR: Tavares 19	Arena: Belgrade Arena; Attendance: 20,997; Referees: Robert Lottermoser, Gytis Vilius, Kristaps Konstantinovs

28 March 2025	ALBA Berlin (German Basketball Federation)	64–108	(Italian Basketball Federation) Virtus Segafredo Bologna	Berlin
20:00	Scoring by quarter: 15–27, 18–35, 11–25, 20–21
	Pts: Thomas 11; Rebs: Rapieque 6 Asts: Delow, Hermannsson 3 PIR: Hermannsson 16	Boxscore	Pts: Polonara 16; Rebs: Clyburn 6 Asts: Pajola 8 PIR: Shengelia 28	Arena: Uber Arena; Attendance: 8,397; Referees: Milan Nedović, Borys Ryzhyk, Amit Balak

28 March 2025	Panathinaikos AKTOR (Hellenic Basketball Federation)	98–101	(French Federation of Basketball) Paris Basketball	Marousi
20:15	Scoring by quarter: 23–33, 25–23, 21–30, 29–15
	Pts: Nunn 22; Rebs: Hernangómez, Nunn 8 Asts: Nunn 9 PIR: Nunn 31	Boxscore	Pts: Shorts 20; Rebs: Shorts 9 Asts: Shorts 14; PIR: Shorts 36	Arena: OAKA Altion; Attendance: 18,540; Referees: Sreten Radović, Emin Moğulkoç, Miloš Koljenšić

=== Round 33 ===
2 April 2025	Fenerbahçe Beko (Turkish Basketball Federation)	75–83	(Spanish Basketball Federation) Barcelona	Istanbul
19:45	Scoring by quarter: 23–21, 27–18, 16–23, 9–21
	Pts: Hayes-Davis 20; Rebs: Hayes-Davis 8 Asts: Gudurić 4 PIR: Hayes-Davis 23	Boxscore	Pts: Parker 24; Rebs: Parra 12; Asts: Satoranský 7 PIR: Parker 27	Arena: Ülker Sports and Event Hall; Attendance: 10,431; Referees: Sreten Radović, Milan Nedović, Saulius Račys

3 April 2025	Žalgiris (Lithuanian Basketball Federation)	70–66	(Basketball Federation of Serbia) Partizan Mozzart Bet	Kaunas
19:00	Scoring by quarter: 24–21, 11–19, 14–9, 21–17
	Pts: Francisco 15; Rebs: Brazdeikis 8 Asts: Brazdeikis 5 PIR: Smailagić 16	Boxscore	Pts: Jones 23; Rebs: Bonga, Davies 6 Asts: Jones 4 PIR: Jones 18	Arena: Žalgirio Arena; Attendance: 14,814; Referees: Carlos Peruga, Oļegs Latiševs, Alberto Baena

3 April 2025	Monaco (French Federation of Basketball)	76–88	(Hellenic Basketball Federation) Panathinaikos AKTOR	Fontvieille
19:00	Scoring by quarter: 21–32, 20–17, 12–16, 23–23
	Pts: Theis 18; Rebs: Theis 7 Asts: James, Okobo 6 PIR: Okobo 20	Boxscore	Pts: Nunn 37; Rebs: Hernangómez 10; Asts: Nunn 5 PIR: Nunn 43	Arena: Salle Gaston Médecin; Attendance: 5,000; Referees: Miguel Ángel Pérez, Jordi Aliaga, Kristaps Konstantinovs

3 April 2025	Maccabi Playtika Tel Aviv (Israeli Basketball Association)	93–90	(German Basketball Federation) Bayern Munich	Belgrade
20:30	Scoring by quarter: 17–22, 31–22, 13–30, 32–16
	Pts: Clark 20; Rebs: Williams 10; Asts: Mayer, Randolph 3 PIR: Randolph 24	Boxscore	Pts: Edwards 33; Rebs: Edwards 4 Asts: Edwards 5 PIR: Edwards 32	Arena: Aleksandar Nikolić Hall; Referees: Ilija Belošević, Juan Carlos García, Marcin Kowalski

3 April 2025	Real Madrid (Spanish Basketball Federation)	105–104	(French Federation of Basketball) Paris Basketball	Madrid
21:00	Scoring by quarter: 23–28, 30–25, 21–27, 31–24
	Pts: Hezonja 26; Rebs: Tavares 9 Asts: Musa 6 PIR: Hezonja 29	Boxscore	Pts: Shorts 24; Rebs: Ward 10; Asts: Shorts 10; PIR: Shorts 23	Arena: Movistar Arena; Attendance: 9,769; Referees: Saša Pukl, Uroš Nikolić, Luka Kardum

4 April 2025	Crvena zvezda Meridianbet (Basketball Federation of Serbia)	96–97(OT)	(Turkish Basketball Federation) Anadolu Efes	Belgrade
20:00	Scoring by quarter: 24–16, 27–28, 13–22, 24–22, Overtime: 8–9
	Pts: Petrušev 23; Rebs: Davidovac, Giedraitis 6 Asts: Miller-McIntyre 7 PIR: Petrušev 21	Boxscore	Pts: Bryant 17; Rebs: Bryant 8 Asts: Thompson 6 PIR: Poirier 26	Arena: Belgrade Arena; Attendance: 16,551; Referees: Emilio Pérez, Artūras Šukys, Michele Rossi

4 April 2025	ALBA Berlin (German Basketball Federation)	92–100	(Hellenic Basketball Federation) Olympiacos	Berlin
20:00	Scoring by quarter: 17–36, 29–25, 27–19, 19–20
	Pts: Wetzell 19; Rebs: Schneider 7 Asts: Hermannsson, McDowell-White 10; PIR: Wetzell 24	Boxscore	Pts: Peters 33; Rebs: Vezenkov 7 Asts: Williams-Goss 7 PIR: Williams-Goss 32	Arena: Uber Arena; Attendance: 11,050; Referees: Emin Moğulkoç, Seffi Shemmesh, Adar Peer

4 April 2025	Virtus Segafredo Bologna (Italian Basketball Federation)	90–70	(Italian Basketball Federation) EA7 Emporio Armani Milan	Bologna
20:30	Scoring by quarter: 22–9, 22–20, 21–13, 25–28
	Pts: Morgan 16; Rebs: three players 4 Asts: three players 3 PIR: Morgan 19	Boxscore	Pts: LeDay 19; Rebs: Ricci 6 Asts: Mannion 4 PIR: Ricci 17	Arena: Segafredo Arena; Attendance: 8,228; Referees: Mehdi Difallah, Carlos Cortés, Maxime Boubert

4 April 2025	Baskonia (Spanish Basketball Federation)	111–75	(French Federation of Basketball) LDLC ASVEL	Vitoria-Gasteiz
20:30	Scoring by quarter: 30–14, 32–20, 30–19, 19–22
	Pts: Howard 25; Rebs: Hall 8 Asts: Forrest 5 PIR: Forrest, Moneke 21	Boxscore	Pts: Ajinça 16; Rebs: Roberson 6 Asts: Maledon 4 PIR: Ajinça 16	Arena: Buesa Arena; Attendance: 9,704; Referees: Carmelo Paternicò, Gytis Vilius, Tomasz Trawicki

=== Round 34 ===
10 April 2025	LDLC ASVEL (French Federation of Basketball)	78–83	(French Federation of Basketball) Monaco	Villeurbanne
20:00	Scoring by quarter: 15–22, 20–19, 20–16, 21–26
	Pts: Sako 20; Rebs: Roberson 12; Asts: de Colo 5 PIR: Sako 29	Boxscore	Pts: James 20; Rebs: Loyd 6 Asts: James 7 PIR: James 26	Arena: Astroballe; Attendance: 5,560; Referees: Sreten Radović, Milan Nedović, Miloš Koljenšić

10 April 2025	Bayern Munich (German Basketball Federation)	77–89	(Turkish Basketball Federation) Fenerbahçe Beko	Munich
20:00	Scoring by quarter: 13–28, 18–18, 21–22, 25–21
	Pts: Edwards 26; Rebs: Napier 6 Asts: Napier 4 PIR: Edwards 23	Boxscore	Pts: Hayes-Davis 24; Rebs: Melli 8 Asts: Hayes-Davis 5 PIR: Hayes-Davis 32	Arena: SAP Garden; Attendance: 11,200; Referees: Damir Javor, Carlos Cortés, Luka Kardum

10 April 2025	Olympiacos (Hellenic Basketball Federation)	99–93	(Israeli Basketball Association) Maccabi Playtika Tel Aviv	Piraeus
20:15	Scoring by quarter: 31–28, 20–20, 19–22, 29–23
	Pts: Fournier 27; Rebs: Peters, Vezenkov 7 Asts: Williams-Goss 13; PIR: Wright 28	Boxscore	Pts: Williams 17; Rebs: Williams 13; Asts: Blatt 5 PIR: Jokubaitis, Williams 18	Arena: Peace and Friendship Stadium; Attendance: 11,077; Referees: Carmelo Paternicò, Emilio Pérez, Kristaps Konstantinovs

10 April 2025	Partizan Mozzart Bet (Basketball Federation of Serbia)	89–91	(Spanish Basketball Federation) Real Madrid	Belgrade
20:30	Scoring by quarter: 24–22, 22–26, 28–17, 15–26
	Pts: Davies 22; Rebs: Bonga 11; Asts: Jones 6 PIR: Davies 22	Boxscore	Pts: Musa 15; Rebs: Ibaka 10; Asts: Campazzo 7 PIR: Campazzo 23	Arena: Belgrade Arena; Attendance: 19,212; Referees: Mehdi Difallah, Saulius Račys, Michele Rossi

10 April 2025	EA7 Emporio Armani Milan (Italian Basketball Federation)	111–89	(Spanish Basketball Federation) Baskonia	Assago
20:30	Scoring by quarter: 31–18, 31–17, 20–26, 29–28
	Pts: LeDay 32; Rebs: Mirotić 10; Asts: Mannion 7 PIR: Mirotić 40	Boxscore	Pts: Šamanić 17; Rebs: Šamanić 7 Asts: Forrest 5 PIR: Šamanić 21	Arena: Unipol Forum; Attendance: 8,548; Referees: Emin Moğulkoç, Borys Ryzhyk, Artūras Šukys

10 April 2025	Paris Basketball (French Federation of Basketball)	72–63	(German Basketball Federation) ALBA Berlin	Paris
20:45	Scoring by quarter: 22–14, 24–17, 14–8, 12–24
	Pts: Hifi, Jantunen 15; Rebs: Jantunen, Ward 6 Asts: Shorts 7 PIR: Ward 20	Boxscore	Pts: Bean 14; Rebs: McCormack 6 Asts: Olinde 6 PIR: Bean 18	Arena: Adidas Arena; Attendance: 8,417; Referees: Juan Carlos García, Jordi Aliaga, Piotr Pastusiak

11 April 2025	Anadolu Efes (Turkish Basketball Federation)	87–77	(Lithuanian Basketball Federation) Žalgiris	Istanbul
19:30	Scoring by quarter: 22–14, 27–23, 22–27, 16–13
	Pts: Larkin, Nwora 13; Rebs: Oturu 7 Asts: Thompson 8 PIR: Thompson 19	Boxscore	Pts: Francisco, Ulanovas 12; Rebs: Brazdeikis 7 Asts: Francisco 5 PIR: Ulanovas 12	Arena: Basketball Development Center; Attendance: 9,980; Referees: Miguel Ángel Pérez, Uroš Nikolić, Hugues Thépénier

11 April 2025	Panathinaikos AKTOR (Hellenic Basketball Federation)	111–104(OT)	(Basketball Federation of Serbia) Crvena zvezda Meridianbet	Marousi
20:15	Scoring by quarter: 23–26, 24–23, 30–28, 19–19, Overtime: 15–8
	Pts: Nunn 31; Rebs: Hernangómez 11; Asts: Nunn 10; PIR: Nunn 35	Boxscore	Pts: Miller-McIntyre 26; Rebs: Petrušev 6 Asts: Nedović 6 PIR: Nedović 28	Arena: OAKA Altion; Attendance: 18,499; Referees: Carlos Peruga, Oļegs Latiševs, Alberto Baena

11 April 2025	Barcelona (Spanish Basketball Federation)	91–87	(Italian Basketball Federation) Virtus Segafredo Bologna	Barcelona
20:30	Scoring by quarter: 23–16, 22–22, 26–27, 20–22
	Pts: Punter 20; Rebs: Hernangómez 7 Asts: Satoranský 9 PIR: Punter 22	Boxscore	Pts: Shengelia 17; Rebs: Polonara 6 Asts: Pajola 6 PIR: Holiday 16	Arena: Palau Blaugrana; Attendance: 6,955; Referees: Robert Lottermoser, Jakub Zamojski, Rain Peerandi

== Attendances ==
Pos	Team	Total	High	Low	Average	Change
1	(Basketball Federation of Serbia) Partizan Mozzart Bet	315,359	20,111	7,494	18,551	−6.9%
2	(Basketball Federation of Serbia) Crvena zvezda Meridianbet	310,066	20,999	7,467	18,239	+2.2%
3	(Hellenic Basketball Federation) Panathinaikos AKTOR	292,670	18,940	12,455	17,216	+12.5%
4	(Lithuanian Basketball Federation) Žalgiris	252,826	15,325	14,357	14,872	+0.7%
5	(Hellenic Basketball Federation) Olympiacos	196,289	12,349	9,737	11,546	+0.1%
6	(German Basketball Federation) Bayern Munich	184,959	11,200	10,088	10,880	+75.0%
7	(Turkish Basketball Federation) Fenerbahçe Beko	171,157	12,920	1,416	10,068	0.0%
8	(Spanish Basketball Federation) Baskonia	161,190	14,204	7,155	9,482	−4.9%
9	(German Basketball Federation) ALBA Berlin	156,064	13,591	4,897	9,180	−2.4%
10	(Italian Basketball Federation) EA7 Emporio Armani Milan	155,678	12,486	7,315	9,158	−8.9%
11	(Turkish Basketball Federation) Anadolu Efes	152,187	9,980	4,412	8,952	−28.2%
12	(Spanish Basketball Federation) Real Madrid	152,041	12,130	7,123	8,944	+0.3%
13	(Italian Basketball Federation) Virtus Segafredo Bologna	132,588	9,071	6,104	7,799	−2.9%
14	(French Federation of Basketball) Paris Basketball	129,758	15,356	3,359	7,633	n/a^{1}
15	(French Federation of Basketball) LDLC ASVEL	125,257	11,782	4,974	7,368	−2.6%
16	(Spanish Basketball Federation) Barcelona	105,773	7,572	5,297	6,222	−3.4%
17	(French Federation of Basketball) Monaco	66,413	5,000	2,432	3,907	−3.6%
18	(Israeli Basketball Association) Maccabi Playtika Tel Aviv	3,204	650	0	178	−72.5%
	League total	3,060,275	20,999	1,416	10,589	+0.8%

Updated to match(es) played on 11 April 2025. Source: EuroLeague
Notes:
1: Team did not participate in the last EuroLeague regular season.

1. Maccabi Playtika Tel Aviv played their home games at Aleksandar Nikolic Hall in Serbia's capital, Belgrade, due to security concerns derived from the Gaza war.
2. Fenerbahçe Beko game against Maccabi Playtika Tel Aviv was relocated to Žalgiris Arena in Kaunas, Lithuania due to security concerns.
3. Crvena zvezda Meridianbet and Partizan Mozzart Bet played two and one game respectively at Aleksandar Nikolić Hall due to availability reasons of Belgrade Arena.
4. Anadolu Efes game against Maccabi Playtika Tel Aviv was relocated to Xiaomi Arena in Riga, Latvia due to security concerns.
