= 2024–25 KK Partizan season =

Serbian basketball club season

Partizan Mozzart Bet
2024–25 season
- ABA League champions
- Serbian League champions
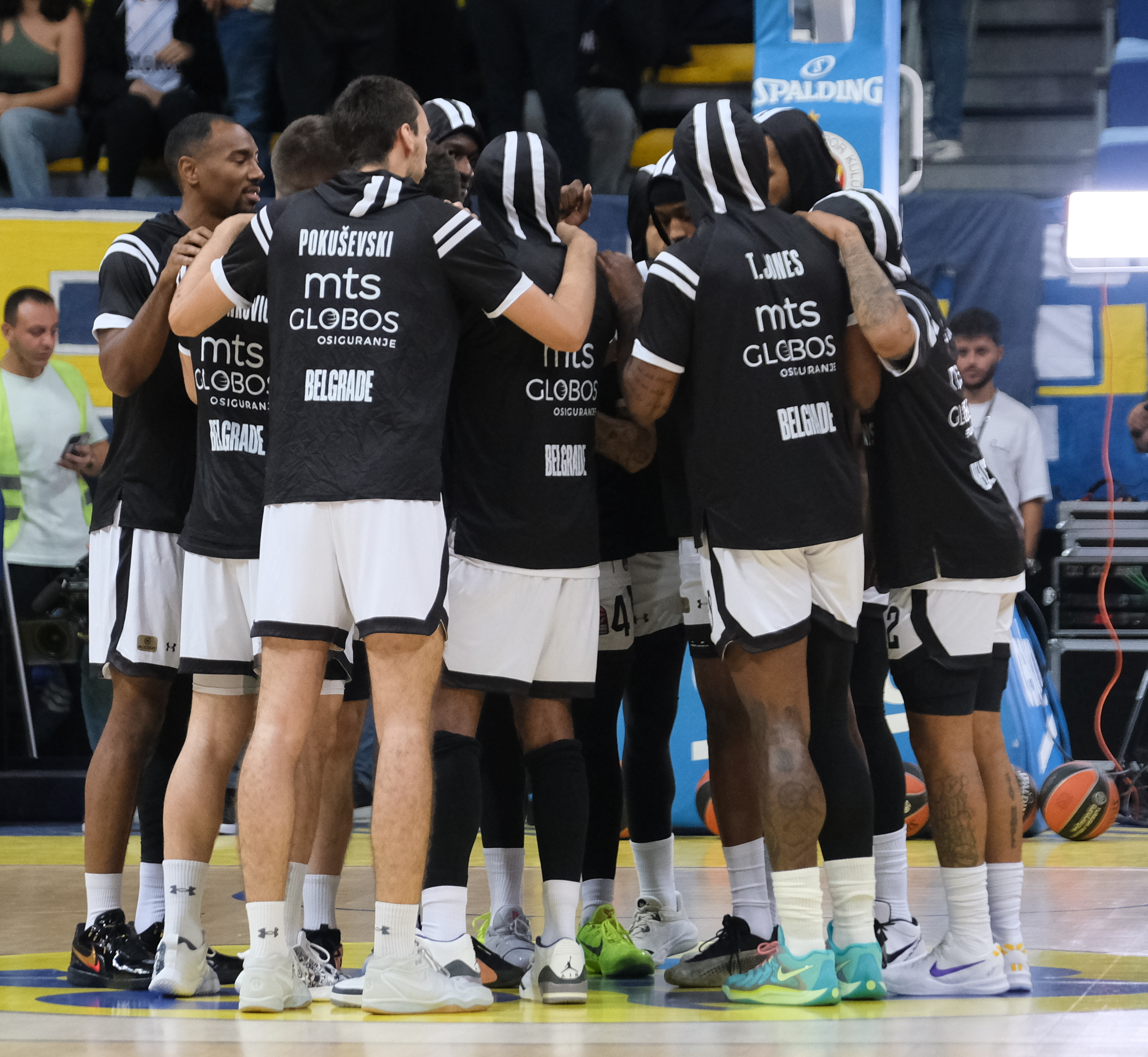
- Roster in November 2024
- President: (Serbia) Ostoja Mijailović
- Head coach: (Serbia) Željko Obradović (Serbia) Bogdan Karaičić (in Serbian League)
- Arena: Belgrade Arena
- ABA League: Champions
- Serbian League: Champions
- EuroLeague: 12th
- Serbian Cup: Runner-up
- Highest home attendance: 21,434 vs (Montenegro) Budućnost (12 June 2025)
- Average home attendance: 18,550 (in EuroLeague); 9,184 (in ABA League)
- Biggest win: 110–64 vs (Croatia) Split (30 November 2024)
- Biggest defeat: 65–97 vs (Turkey) Anadolu Efes (21 March 2025)
Home	Away
- All statistics correct as of 12 April 2025.

In the 2024–25 season, Partizan competed in the Serbian League, Radivoj Korać Cup, ABA League and EuroLeague.

== Players ==
=== Current roster ===
Note: Flags indicate national team eligibility at FIBA-sanctioned events. Players may hold other non-FIBA nationalities not displayed.

Partizan Mozzart Bet roster
Players
Coaches

Pos.	No.	Nat.	Name	Ht.	Wt.	Age
C	0	(United States) (Uganda)	Davies, Brandon	2.08 m (6 ft 10 in)	109 kg (240 lb)	35 – 25 July 1991
G	1	(Denmark)	Lundberg, Gabriel	1.93 m (6 ft 4 in)	92 kg (203 lb)	31 – 4 December 1994
PG	2	(United States) (South Sudan)	Jones, Carlik	1.83 m (6 ft 0 in)	81 kg (179 lb)	28 – 23 December 1997
G	3	(France) (Rwanda)	Ntilikina, Frank	1.93 m (6 ft 4 in)	91 kg (201 lb)	28 – 28 July 1998
SG	4	(Germany) (United States)	Washington Jr., Duane	1.88 m (6 ft 2 in)	89 kg (196 lb)	26 – 24 March 2000
C	5	(Serbia)	Koprivica, Balša	2.16 m (7 ft 1 in)	109 kg (240 lb)	26 – 1 May 2000
SF	7	(Serbia) (Croatia)	Nakić, Mario	2.02 m (6 ft 8 in)	99 kg (218 lb)	25 – 14 June 2001
G/F	8	(Serbia)	Bošnjaković, Mitar	2.00 m (6 ft 7 in)	94 kg (207 lb)	20 – 24 August 2006
G/F	9	(Serbia)	Marinković, Vanja (C)	1.99 m (6 ft 6 in)	85 kg (187 lb)	29 – 9 January 1997
SG	10	(Serbia)	Mijailović, Uroš (Y)	1.95 m (6 ft 5 in)		18 – 6 March 2008
F/C	11	(Serbia)	Pokuševski, Aleksej	2.13 m (7 ft 0 in)	95 kg (209 lb)	24 – 26 December 2001
G/F	12	(United States)	Brown, Sterling	1.96 m (6 ft 5 in)	99 kg (218 lb)	31 – 10 February 1995
F	17	(Germany) (Democratic Republic of the Congo)	Bonga, Isaac	2.03 m (6 ft 8 in)	82 kg (181 lb)	27 – 8 November 1999
G	19	(Serbia)	Lakić, Arijan	1.98 m (6 ft 6 in)	82 kg (181 lb)	26 – 20 January 2000
G	21	(Serbia)	Šekularac, Đorđe (Y)	1.98 m (6 ft 6 in)		19 – 23 July 2007
PF	24	(Canada)	Mike, Isiaha	2.03 m (6 ft 8 in)	98 kg (216 lb)	29 – 11 August 1997
F/C	27	(Serbia)	Dimitrijević, Aleksa	2.13 m (7 ft 0 in)	95 kg (209 lb)	20 – 30 May 2006
G/F	44	(Serbia)	Danilović, Uroš (Y)	2.01 m (6 ft 7 in)		19 – 15 September 2007
C	88	(United States)	Jones, Tyrique	2.06 m (6 ft 9 in)	108 kg (238 lb)	29 – 3 May 1997

Head coach

- (Serbia) Željko Obradović

Assistant coach(es)

- (Serbia) Vladimir Androić
- (Spain) Josep Maria Izquierdo
- (Serbia) Bogdan Karaičić
- (Serbia) Aleksandar Matović

Athletic trainer(s)

- (Serbia) Predrag Zimonjić

Team manager

- (Serbia) Luka Vulikić

Legend

- (C) Team captain
- (Y) Youth player
- Injured

- Roster
- Transactions
Updated: December 5, 2024

=== Players with multiple nationalities ===
- (Uganda) (United States) Brandon Davies
- (Serbia) (Croatia) Mario Nakić
- (Germany) (United States) Duane Washington Jr.
- (South Sudan) (United States) Carlik Jones
- (France) (Rwanda) Frank Ntilikina
- (Germany) (Democratic Republic of the Congo) Isaac Bonga

=== Depth chart ===
Pos.	Starting 5	Bench 1	Bench 2	Bench 3
C	Tyrique Jones	Brandon Davies		Balša Koprivica
PF	Isaac Bonga	Isiaha Mike	Aleksej Pokuševski
SF	Sterling Brown	Vanja Marinković		Mario Nakić
SG	Duane Washington Jr.	Gabriel Lundberg	Arijan Lakić	Mitar Bošnjaković
PG	Carlik Jones	Frank Ntilikina

=== On loan ===
Players out on loan
Nat.	Player	Position	Team	On loan since
(Serbia)	Aleksa Dimitrijević	FC	(Serbia) Metalac Valjevo (Two-way affiliate)	October 2024–April 2025
(Romania)	Luca Illeș	CG	(Serbia) Mega Superbet	January 2025

=== Roster changes ===
==== In ====
No.	Pos.	Nat.	Name	Moving from		Type	Date	Source
9	G/F	(Serbia)	Vanja Marinković	Saski Baskonia	(Spain)	End of contract	17 Jun 2024	
1	CG	(Denmark)	Gabriel Lundberg	Virtus Bologna	(Italy)	End of contract	20 Jun 2024	
3	CG	(France)	Frank Ntilikina	Charlotte Hornets	(United States)	End of contract	20 Jun 2024	
27	F/C	(Serbia)	Aleksa Dimitrijević	Youth system	(Serbia)	Senior contact	15 July 2024	
0	C	(Uganda)	Brandon Davies	Valencia Basket	(Spain)	End of contract	19 August 2024	
2	PG	(South Sudan)	Carlik Jones	Zhejiang Golden Bulls	(China)	End of contract	19 August 2024	
4	CG	(Germany)	Duane Washington Jr.	New York Knicks	(United States)	End of contract	19 August 2024	
7	SF	(Serbia)	Mario Nakić	Igokea	(Bosnia and Herzegovina)	Contract termination	19 August 2024	
8	SF	(Serbia)	Mitar Bošnjaković	Real Madrid	(Spain)	Senior contact	19 August 2024	
11	F	(Serbia)	Aleksej Pokuševski	Charlotte Hornets	(United States)	End of contract	19 August 2024	
12	G/F	(United States)	Sterling Brown	Alba Berlin	(Germany)	Contract termination	19 August 2024	
17	F	(Germany)	Isaac Bonga	Bayern Munich	(Germany)	End of contract	19 August 2024	
19	CG	(Serbia)	Arijan Lakić	Zadar	(Croatia)	End of contract	19 August 2024	
24	PF	(Canada)	Isiaha Mike	JL Bourg	(France)	End of contract	19 August 2024	
88	F/C	(United States)	Tyrique Jones	Anadolu Efes	(Turkey)	End of contract	19 August 2024	
—	CG	(Romania)	Luca Illeș	Youth system	(Serbia)	Senior contact	13 January 2025	

==== Out ====
No.	Pos.	Nat.	Name	Moving to		Type	Date	Source
44	C	(United States)	Frank Kaminsky	Phoenix Suns	(United States)	End of contract	21 May 2024	
13	G/F	(Montenegro)	Đorđije Jovanović	Budućnost VOLI	(Montenegro)	End of contract	13 June 2024	
3	PG	(Serbia)	Savo Drezgić	Georgia Bulldogs	(United States)	Free Transfer	15 June 2024	
7	SG	(United States)	Kevin Punter	FC Barcelona	(Spain)	Parted ways	19 June 2024	
2	F/C	(Azerbaijan)	Zach LeDay	Olimpia Milano	(Italy)	Parted ways	25 June 2024	
9	F/C	(Serbia)	Alen Smailagić	Žalgiris Kaunas	(Lithuania)	End of contract	27 June 2024	
0	CG	(Croatia)	Jaleen Smith	Bahçeşehir Koleji	(Turkey)	End of contract	13 July 2024	
35	G/F	(United States)	PJ Dozier	Minnesota Timberwolves	(United States)	End of contract	15 July 2024	
37	SF	(Poland)	Mateusz Ponitka	Bahçeşehir Koleji	(Turkey)	End of contract	23 July 2024	
33	SG	(Serbia)	Danilo Anđušić	Dubai Basketball	(United Arab Emirates)	End of contract	23 July 2024	
4	G	(Serbia)	Aleksa Avramović	CSKA Moscow	(Russia)	Transfer	25 July 2024	
10	G	(Serbia)	Ognjen Jaramaz	Saski Baskonia	(Spain)	Parted ways	27 August 2024	
50	F/C	(Brazil)	Bruno Caboclo	Hapoel Tel Aviv	(Israel)	Transfer	30 August 2024	
32	SF	(Serbia)	Uroš Trifunović	Tofaş	(Turkey)	End of contract	31 August 2024	
21	SF	(United States)	James Nunnally	Zhejiang Lions	(China)	End of contract	17 January 2025	

== Competitions ==
=== Overall ===
Competition	Started round	Final position / round	First match	Last match
ABA League	Matchday 1	Winners	25 September 2024	12 June 2025
Basketball League of Serbia	Semifinals	Winners	15 June 2025	24 June 2025
EuroLeague	Matchday 1	Regular season/12th	3 October 2024	10 April 2025
Radivoj Korać Cup	Quarterfinals	Runner-up	13 February 2025	15 February 2025

Updated to match played 25 June 2025
Source: Competitions

=== Overview ===
Competition	Record							
Competition	Pld	W	D	L	PF	PA	PD	Win %
ABA League	39	33	0	6	3,552	2,979	+573	84.62
Serbian SuperLeague	5	4	0	1	430	385	+45	80.00
EuroLeague	34	16	0	18	2,780	2,724	+56	47.06
Radivoj Korać Cup	3	2	0	1	251	221	+30	66.67
Total	81	55	0	26	7,013	6,309	+704	67.90

Last updated: 25 June 2025
Source: Competitions

== Pre-season and friendlies ==
Win Loss

28 August 2024	Partizan (Serbia)	85–68	(Bosnia and Herzegovina) Igokea m:tel	Belgrade, Serbia
	Scoring by quarter: 24–22, 19–17, 22–16, 20–13
	Pts: Davies 17; Rebs: not available Asts: not available	Boxscore	Pts: Jones 17; Rebs: not available Asts: not available	Arena: Belgrade Arena

2 September 2024	Partizan (Serbia)	114–85(OT)	(Russia) Yenisey	Čačak, Serbia
18:00	Scoring by quarter: 22–11, 23–21, 22–19, 23–18, Overtime: 24–16
	Pts: Washington Jr. 16; Rebs: not available Asts: not available		Pts: not available Rebs: not available Asts: not available	Arena: Borac Hall

7 September 2024	Bertram Derthona (Italy)	94–96(OT)	(Serbia) Partizan	Trapani, Italy
18:15	Scoring by quarter: 11–16, 30–28, 17–24, 27–17, Overtime: 9–11
Sport Klub	Pts: Baldasso 21; Rebs: Gorham, Baldasso, Kamagate 5 Asts: Kuhse 4	Boxscore	Pts: C. Jones 21; Rebs: Bonga 13; Asts: C. Jones, Lundberg, Brown 4	Arena: PalaIlio; Referees: Tolga Sahin, Carmelo Lo Guzzo, Simone Patti

8 September 2024	Trapani Shark (Italy)	61–89	(Serbia) Partizan	Trapani, Italy
21:00	Scoring by quarter: 19–20, 14–22, 11–26, 17–21
Sport Klub	Pts: Horton 15; Rebs: Yeboah 6 Asts: Galloway 4	Boxscore	Pts: Lundberg 24; Rebs: Bonga, Davies 6 Asts: Pokuševski 3	Arena: PalaIlio; Referees: Tolga Sahin, Carmelo Lo Guzzo, Alessandro Nicolini

13 September 2024	Partizan (Serbia)	93–60	(Greece) AEK Betsson Athens	Belgrade, Serbia
19:00	Scoring by quarter: 27–20, 24–19, 27–8, 15–13
Arena Sport	Pts: Brown, T. Jones 12; Rebs: Pokuševski 5 Asts: Lundberg 5	Boxscore	Pts: Bryce 11; Rebs: Golden, Bryce 4 Asts: Hubb 5	Arena: Belgrade Fair; Attendance: 5,000; Referees: Nemanja Kovačević, Ognjen Ćurčić, Antonije Luković

15 September 2024	Partizan (Serbia)	83–82	(France) Paris Basketball	Belgrade, Serbia
21:00	Scoring by quarter: 21–20, 25–23, 22–22, 15–17
Arena Sport	Pts: Brown, C. Jones, Ntilikina 13; Rebs: Davies 5 Asts: C. Jones 5	Boxscore	Pts: Hifi 19; Rebs: Ward 10; Asts: T. J. Shorts 7	Arena: Belgrade Fair

20 September 2024	Anadolu Efes (Turkey)	81–80	(Serbia) Partizan	Glyfada, Greece
14:00	Scoring by quarter: 24–19, 22–22, 21–18, 14–21
	Pts: Nwora, Bryant 15; Rebs: Nwora 6 Asts: Bryant 6	Boxscore	Pts: T. Jones 24; Rebs: T. Jones 7 Asts: C. Jones 6	Arena: Glyfada Municipal Sports Center

21 September 2024	Panathinaikos AKTOR Athens (Greece)	64–75	(Serbia) Partizan	Athens, Greece
21:00	Scoring by quarter: 8–15, 19–21, 16–21, 21–18
Sport Klub	Pts: Nunn 16	Boxscore	Pts: Washington 13; Rebs: T. Jones 8 Asts: C. Jones 3	Arena: Panathenaic Stadium; Attendance: 35,000

== ABA League ==
=== Regular season ===
Pos	Team	Pld	W	L	PF	PA	PD	Pts	Qualification or relegation
1	(Basketball Federation of Montenegro) Budućnost VOLI	30	26	4	2699	2320	+379	56	Advance to the Playoffs
2	(Basketball Federation of Serbia) Partizan Mozzart Bet	30	26	4	2719	2246	+473	56	Advance to the Playoffs
3	(United Arab Emirates Basketball Association) Dubai Basketball	30	25	5	2633	2324	+309	55	Advance to the Playoffs
4	(Basketball Federation of Serbia) Crvena zvezda Meridianbet	30	23	7	2672	2365	+307	53	Advance to the Playoffs
5	(Basketball Federation of Bosnia and Herzegovina) Igokea m:tel	30	19	11	2628	2599	+29	49	Advance to the Playoffs

Source: ABA League

=== Matches ===
Win Loss

25 September 2024 1	Partizan (Serbia)	96–66	(Serbia) Borac Mozzart	Belgrade
19:00	Scoring by quarter: 24–19, 22–17, 31–12, 19–18
Arena Sport	Pts: C. Jones 14; Rebs: Nakić 8 Asts: Lundberg, Brown 4 PIR: Bonga 20	Report	Pts: Gagić 13; Rebs: Pavićević 7 Asts: Valinskas 3 PIR: Valinskas 17	Arena: Belgrade Arena; Attendance: 18,302; Referees: Milivoje Jovčić, Tomislav Vovk, Ivan Stefanović

29 September 2024 2	Spartak Office Shoes (Serbia)	80–89	(Serbia) Partizan	Subotica
19:00	Scoring by quarter: 25–24, 19–17, 15–18, 21–30
Arena Sport, RTV 1	Pts: Miletić 16; Rebs: Cerovina 10; Asts: Gordić 6 PIR: Miletić 20	Report	Pts: Brown 21; Rebs: Brown, Marinković, Koprivica 5 Asts: C. Jones 7 PIR: C. Jones 21	Arena: Dudova Šuma Hall; Attendance: 4,500; Referees: Tomislav Hordov, Sašo Petek, Dragan Porobić

6 October 2024 3	Partizan (Serbia)	113–78	(Croatia) Cibona	Belgrade
18:30	Scoring by quarter: 34–20, 29–27, 28–19, 22–12
Arena Sport	Pts: Nakić 18; Rebs: Koprivica 7 Asts: Ntilikina 5 PIR: Nakić 25	Report	Pts: Barber 20; Rebs: Perasović 6 Asts: Ročak 5 PIR: Barber, Majcunić 15	Arena: Belgrade Arena; Attendance: 8,358; Referees: Milan Nedović, Marko Juras, Bojan Kruljac

12 October 2024 4	SC Derby (Montenegro)	60–80	(Serbia) Partizan	Podgorica
16:00	Scoring by quarter: 17–23, 18–23, 15–12, 10–22
Arena Sport	Pts: Hadžibegović 13; Rebs: Nikolić 6 Asts: Neal 5 PIR: Neal 16	Report	Pts: C. Jones 19; Rebs: Bonga 6 Asts: C. Jones 3 PIR: C. Jones 25	Arena: Morača Sports Center; Attendance: 2,140; Referees: Saša Pukl, Luka Kardum, Franko Gracin

20 October 2024 5	Zadar (Croatia)	71–75	(Serbia) Partizan	Zadar
19:00	Scoring by quarter: 19–20, 12–22, 27–12, 13–21
Arena Sport	Pts: Mihailović 29; Rebs: Ramljak 9 Asts: Žganec, Mazalin 4 PIR: Mihailović 24	Report	Pts: Bonga 16; Rebs: Koprivica 7 Asts: Brown 3 PIR: Bonga 21	Arena: Krešimir Ćosić Hall; Attendance: 5,000; Referees: Milan Nedović, Miloš Koljenšić, Dragan Porobić

26 October 2024 6	Partizan (Serbia)	96–63	(Slovenia) Krka	Belgrade
19:00	Scoring by quarter: 18–16, 23–12, 29–20, 26–15
Arena Sport	Pts: Nakić, Washington Jr. 16; Rebs: Nakić, Pokuševski 9 Asts: Davies 4 PIR: Nakić 20	Report	Pts: García 14; Rebs: Cerkvenik 5 Asts: Persons 9 PIR: Čebašek 14	Arena: Belgrade Arena; Attendance: 10,319; Referees: Luka Kardum, Gordan Terlević, Krešimir Katić

4 November 2024 7	FMP Soccerbet (Serbia)	64–91	(Serbia) Partizan	Belgrade
17:00	Scoring by quarter: 17–29, 11–26, 20–15, 16–21
Arena Sport	Pts: Rebec 16; Rebs: Tasić 9 Asts: Rebec 4 PIR: Tasić 18	Report	Pts: Lundberg 15; Rebs: Mike 9 Asts: Lundberg 4 PIR: Lundberg 29	Arena: Železnik Hall; Attendance: 872; Referees: Uroš Nikolić, Sašo Petek, Josip Radojković

10 November 2024 8	Partizan (Serbia)	82–61	(United Arab Emirates) Dubai Basketball	Belgrade
21:00	Scoring by quarter: 16–19, 19–8, 19–17, 28–17
Arena Sport	Pts: C. Jones 17; Rebs: T. Jones, Bonga, Ntilikina 4 Asts: C. Jones 4 PIR: C. Jones 18	Report	Pts: Anđušić 13; Rebs: Abass 8 Asts: Prepelič 3 PIR: Anđušić 17	Arena: Belgrade Arena; Attendance: 7,680; Referees: Miloš Koljenšić, Mario Majkić, Marko Mustapić

17 November 2024 9	Mornar Barsko zlato (Montenegro)	78–105	(Serbia) Partizan	Bar
17:00	Scoring by quarter: 16–28, 14–21, 26–29, 22–27
Arena Sport	Pts: Buljević 17; Rebs: Buljević, Bediako 4 Asts: Carter Jr. 5 PIR: Buljević, Carter Jr. 14	Report	Pts: Koprivica 26; Rebs: Koprivica 12; Asts: Bošnjaković 6 PIR: Koprivica 43	Arena: Topolica Sport Hall; Attendance: 2,500; Referees: Denis Hadžić, Krunoslav Peić, Gordan Terlević

30 November 2024 10	Partizan (Serbia)	110–64	(Croatia) Split	Belgrade
19:00	Scoring by quarter: 25–9, 28–22, 29–20, 28–13
Arena Sport	Pts: Washington 24; Rebs: Koprivica 8 Asts: Washington 5 PIR: Washington 26	Report	Pts: Škara, Vuko 14; Rebs: Ljubičić, Tišma, Škara 5 Asts: Kapusta 9 PIR: Škara 15	Arena: Belgrade Arena; Attendance: 5,672; Referees: Uroš Nikolić, Igor Dragojević, Ernad Karović

8 December 2024 11	Igokea m:tel (Bosnia and Herzegovina)	80–107	(Serbia) Partizan	Laktaši
17:00	Scoring by quarter: 25–24, 20–34, 13–27, 22–22
Arena Sport	Pts: B. Jones 17; Rebs: Carter 8 Asts: B. Jones 11; PIR: B. Jones 26	Report	Pts: Washington 28; Rebs: Koprivica 10; Asts: C. Jones 5 PIR: Washington 25	Arena: Laktaši Sports Hall; Attendance: 3,000; Referees: Josip Radojković, Denis Hadžić, Mario Majkić

15 December 2024 12	Partizan (Serbia)	90–97	(Montenegro) Budućnost VOLI	Belgrade
20:00	Scoring by quarter: 24–22, 22–32, 22–23, 22–20
Arena Sport	Pts: Brown 23; Rebs: T. Jones 8 Asts: Brown, T. Jones 3 PIR: Brown 24	Report	Pts: Sulaimon, Wright IV 22; Rebs: Kamenjaš 9 Asts: Wright IV 6 PIR: Wright IV 26	Arena: Belgrade Arena; Attendance: 10,116; Referees: Damir Javor, Sašo Petek, Dragan Porobić

23 December 2024 13	Crvena zvezda Meridianbet (Serbia)	89–84	(Serbia) Partizan	Belgrade
19:00	Scoring by quarter: 23–26, 27–25, 23–21, 16–12
Arena Sport	Pts: Bolomboy 14; Rebs: Davidovac 5 Asts: Kalinić, Miller-McIntyre 4 PIR: Kalinić 17	Report	Pts: C. Jones 19; Rebs: T. Jones 12; Asts: C. Jones 7 PIR: C. Jones 21	Arena: Belgrade Arena; Attendance: 13,584; Referees: Uroš Nikolić, Tomislav Hordov, Luka Kardum

30 December 2024 14	Partizan (Serbia)	78–76	(Slovenia) Cedevita Olimpija	Belgrade
19:00	Scoring by quarter: 14–21, 20–18, 18–24, 26–13
Arena Sport	Pts: Washington 18; Rebs: Bonga 7 Asts: Washington 4 PIR: Washington 18	Report	Pts: Lemar 24; Rebs: Stewart Jr., Robinson, Beringer 6 Asts: Stewart Jr. 6 PIR: Lemar 26	Arena: Belgrade Arena; Attendance: 5,953; Referees: Sašo Petek, Uroš Obrknežević, Josip Radojković

6 January 2025 15	Mega Superbet (Serbia)	90–100(OT)	(Serbia) Partizan	Belgrade
12:00	Scoring by quarter: 27–20, 21–21, 15–19, 19–22, Overtime: 8–18
Arena Sport	Pts: Jelavić 23; Rebs: Jelavić 14; Asts: Petrović 9 PIR: Jelavić 32	Report	Pts: Washington 19; Rebs: T. Jones 8 Asts: Washington 6 PIR: T. Jones 22	Arena: Aleksandar Nikolić Hall; Attendance: 2,000; Referees: Saša Pukl, Milan Nedović, Nermin Nikšić

11 January 2025 16	Borac Mozzart (Serbia)	60–89	(Serbia) Partizan	Čačak
19:00	Scoring by quarter: 14–26, 18–17, 18–26, 10–20
Arena Sport	Pts: Furmanavičius 13; Rebs: Jošilo 6 Asts: Baldwin 3 PIR: Ćurčić 12	Report	Pts: Koprivica 21; Rebs: Mike 10; Asts: Washington 9 PIR: Koprivica 30	Arena: Borac Hall; Attendance: 2,600; Referees: Miloš Koljenšić, Stefan Ćalić, Vladimir Tomić

19 January 2025 17	Partizan (Serbia)	103–80	(Serbia) Spartak Office Shoes	Belgrade
19:00	Scoring by quarter: 19–24, 31–23, 22–23, 31–10
Arena Sport, RTV 1	Pts: Brown 25; Rebs: Brown, Bonga, Davies 5 Asts: C. Jones 5 PIR: Brown 25	Report	Pts: Bolton 20; Rebs: Cerovina 7 Asts: Cerovina 5 PIR: Bolton 22	Arena: Belgrade Arena; Attendance: 12,216; Referees: Damir Javor, Tomislav Hordov, Ivan Stefanović

26 January 2025 18	Cibona (Croatia)	59–93	(Serbia) Partizan	Zagreb
17:00	Scoring by quarter: 15–18, 13–26, 18–23, 13–26
Arena Sport	Pts: Radovčić 12; Rebs: Skorić 8 Asts: Vuković, Ročak, Smajlagić, Majcunić, Bart 2 PIR: Vuković 10	Report	Pts: Pokuševski 21; Rebs: Nakić 7 Asts: Nakić 5 PIR: Pokuševski 27	Arena: Dražen Petrović Basketball Hall; Attendance: 2,000; Referees: Milan Nedović, Mario Majkić, Ernad Karović

2 February 2025 19	Partizan (Serbia)	95–80	(Montenegro) SC Derby	Belgrade
20:00	Scoring by quarter: 19–25, 26–13, 28–19, 22–23
Arena Sport	Pts: Washington 21; Rebs: Pokuševski, T. Jones 5 Asts: Lundberg 5 PIR: Washington 23	Report	Pts: Bogavac 24; Rebs: Neal 7 Asts: Neal 10; PIR: Bogavac 23	Arena: Belgrade Arena; Attendance: 4,721; Referees: Saša Pukl, Denis Hadžić, Marko Mustapić

10 February 2025 20	Partizan (Serbia)	100–75	(Croatia) Zadar	Belgrade
18:00	Scoring by quarter: 22–16, 29–19, 21–25, 28–15
Arena Sport	Pts: Lundberg 17; Rebs: Koprivica 9 Asts: Lundberg 8 PIR: Koprivica 26	Report	Pts: Mazalin 21; Rebs: Žganec, Gilbert 5 Asts: Mihailović 4 PIR: Mihailović 20	Arena: Belgrade Arena; Attendance: 4,406; Referees: Milan Nedović, Igor Dragojević, Vojislav Lepetić

2 March 2025 21	Krka (Slovenia)	77–79(OT)	(Serbia) Partizan	Novo Mesto
18:00	Scoring by quarter: 21–11, 21–19, 14–19, 11–18, Overtime: 10–12
Arena Sport	Pts: Persons 22; Rebs: Cerkvenik 8 Asts: Persons 10; PIR: Persons 29	Report	Pts: C. Jones 17; Rebs: C. Jones, Pokuševski, Marinković 5 Asts: C. Jones 8 PIR: C. Jones 20	Arena: Leon Štukelj Hall; Attendance: 1,500; Referees: Damir Javor, Marko Mustapić, Bojan Kruljac

10 March 2025 22	Partizan (Serbia)	90–65	(Serbia) FMP Soccerbet	Belgrade
19:00	Scoring by quarter: 26–21, 18–15, 23–12, 23–17
Arena Sport	Pts: Washington 15; Rebs: Koprivica 8 Asts: Ntilikina, Lakić 4 PIR: Pokuševski 19	Report	Pts: Barna 18; Rebs: Stephens 8 Asts: Scott 5 PIR: Barna 16	Arena: Belgrade Arena; Attendance: 5,215; Referees: Marko Juras, Mario Majkić, Vladimir Jevtović

17 March 2025 23	Dubai Basketball (United Arab Emirates)	80–72	(Serbia) Partizan	Dubai
16:30	Scoring by quarter: 26–14, 15–15, 16–19, 23–24
Arena Sport	Pts: Abass 14; Rebs: Prepelič, Boutsiele 5 Asts: Prepelič, Mason 6 PIR: Abass 18	Report	Pts: C. Jones 16; Rebs: T. Jones 10; Asts: C. Jones 5 PIR: C. Jones, Davies 16	Arena: Coca-Cola Arena; Attendance: 5,800; Referees: Tomislav Hordov, Igor Dragojević, Josip Radojković

23 March 2025 24	Partizan (Serbia)	89–84	(Montenegro) Mornar Barsko zlato	Belgrade
17:00	Scoring by quarter: 26–18, 14–18, 20–18, 29–30
Arena Sport	Pts: Koprivica 22; Rebs: Koprivica, Mike 8 Asts: Ntilikina 7 PIR: Koprivica 35	Report	Pts: Bulatović 17; Rebs: Rogić 5 Asts: Rogić 12; PIR: Rogić 14	Arena: Belgrade Arena; Attendance: 2,247; Referees: Nermin Nikšić, Marko Mustapić, Bojan Popović

30 March 2025 25	Split (Croatia)	64–81	(Serbia) Partizan	Split
18:30	Scoring by quarter: 19–21, 11–20, 20–23, 14–17
Arena Sport	Pts: Shorter 17; Rebs: Škara, Vuko 8 Asts: Kapusta 4 PIR: Shorter 18	Report	Pts: Brown 19; Rebs: Mike 7 Asts: Brown 4 PIR: Brown 21	Arena: Arena Gripe; Attendance: 2,100; Referees: Damir Javor, Miloš Koljenšić, Edo Javor

6 April 2025 26	Partizan (Serbia)	100–94	(Bosnia and Herzegovina) Igokea m:tel	Belgrade
19:30	Scoring by quarter: 32–26, 22–32, 28–17, 18–19
Arena Sport	Pts: Marinković 22; Rebs: Bonga 12; Asts: Bonga 7 PIR: Bonga 32	Report	Pts: Milosavljević, Jones 21; Rebs: Milosavljević, Simanić 5 Asts: Jones 7 PIR: Milosavljević, Jones 26	Arena: Belgrade Arena; Attendance: 2,847; Referees: Milivoje Jovčić, Igor Dragojević, Denis Hadžić

14 April 2025 27	Budućnost VOLI (Montenegro)	81–77	(Serbia) Partizan	Podgorica
19:00	Scoring by quarter: 21–20, 22–13, 25–24, 13–20
Arena Sport	Pts: Wright IV 17; Rebs: Jovanović 7 Asts: Wright IV 6 PIR: Wright IV 18	Report	Pts: C. Jones 23; Rebs: Bonga 6 Asts: Bonga 3 PIR: C. Jones 27	Arena: Morača Sports Center; Attendance: 5,250; Referees: Milan Nedović, Luka Kardum, Mario Majkić

21 April 2025 28	Partizan (Serbia)	85–77	(Serbia) Crvena zvezda Meridianbet	Belgrade
20:30	Scoring by quarter: 18–18, 21–14, 18–24, 28–21
Arena Sport, RTS 1	Pts: Brown 24; Rebs: T. Jones, Bonga, Mike 6 Asts: C. Jones 9 PIR: Brown 25	Report	Pts: Petrušev, Nedović 19; Rebs: Kalinić 9 Asts: Mitrović 6 PIR: Petrušev 23	Arena: Belgrade Arena; Attendance: 16,970; Referees: Tomislav Hordov, Miloš Koljenšić, Marko Mustapić

27 April 2025 29	Cedevita Olimpija (Slovenia)	71–81	(Serbia) Partizan	Ljubljana
17:00	Scoring by quarter: 18–23, 14–21, 18–15, 21–22
Arena Sport	Pts: Lemar 17; Rebs: Robinson 7 Asts: Jones 5 PIR: Jones 16	Report	Pts: Marinković 14; Rebs: T. Jones 7 Asts: C. Jones 5 PIR: Mike 19	Arena: Arena Stožice; Attendance: 8,375; Referees: Igor Dragojević, Denis Hadžić, Dragan Porobić

4 May 2025 30	Partizan (Serbia)	89–82	(Serbia) Mega Superbet	Belgrade
19:30	Scoring by quarter: 34–23, 20–16, 22–19, 13–24
Arena Sport	Pts: Marinković 23; Rebs: Pokuševski 12; Asts: C. Jones 3 PIR: Marinković 23	Report	Pts: Jović 15; Rebs: Jelavić 7 Asts: Petrović 6 PIR: Marković 19	Arena: Belgrade Arena; Attendance: 3,945; Referees: Sašo Petek, Josip Radojković, Franko Gracin

=== Playoff ===
==== Quarterfinals ====
9 May 2025 G1	Partizan (Serbia)	100–75	(Serbia) Spartak Office Shoes	Belgrade
19:00	Scoring by quarter: 23–27, 30–17, 23–18, 24–13
Arena Sport	Pts: Washington Jr. 21; Rebs: Pokuševski 8 Asts: Pokuševski 5 PIR: Pokuševski 26	Report	Pts: Medarević 16; Rebs: Ilić 8 Asts: Gordić, Bolton 4 PIR: Medarević 19	Arena: Belgrade Arena; Attendance: 5,336; Referees: Saša Pukl, Igor Dragojević, Stefan Ćalić

16 May 2025 G2	Spartak Office Shoes (Serbia)	75–82	(Serbia) Partizan	Subotica
21:00	Scoring by quarter: 21–28, 22–17, 18–18, 14–19
Arena Sport	Pts: Cerovina 22; Rebs: Cerovina 9 Asts: Cerovina 6 PIR: Cerovina 33	Report	Pts: C. Jones 18; Rebs: Pokuševski 6 Asts: C. Jones 6 PIR: Davies 27	Arena: Dudova Šuma Hall; Attendance: 3,500; Referees: Tomislav Hordov, Milivoje Jovčić, Josip Radojković

==== Semifinals ====
26 May 2025 G1	Partizan (Serbia)	102–72	(United Arab Emirates) Dubai Basketball	Belgrade
19:00	Scoring by quarter: 28–20, 25–13, 32–22, 17–17
Arena Sport	Pts: Brown 21; Rebs: Korpivica 7 Asts: C. Jones 8 PIR: Brown, Washington Jr. 20	Report	Pts: Bertāns 17; Rebs: Boutsiele 4 Asts: Mason 5 PIR: Bertāns 14	Arena: Belgrade Arena; Attendance: 9,897; Referees: Tomislav Hordov, Sašo Petek, Miloš Koljenšić

29 May 2025 G2	Dubai Basketball (United Arab Emirates)	100–95(OT)	(Serbia) Partizan	Dubai
17:30	Scoring by quarter: 29–23, 21–24, 22–26, 13–12, Overtime: 15–10
Arena Sport	Pts: Prepelič 30; Rebs: Mason 5 Asts: Mason 6 PIR: Prepelič 34	Report	Pts: C. Jones 25; Rebs: T. Jones 8 Asts: C. Jones 6 PIR: C. Jones 22	Arena: Coca-Cola Arena; Attendance: 6,912; Referees: Milan Nedović, Igor Dragojević, Denis Hadžić

1 June 2025 G3	Partizan (Serbia)	114–97	(United Arab Emirates) Dubai Basketball	Belgrade
19:00	Scoring by quarter: 23–32, 29–21, 34–20, 28–24
Arena Sport	Pts: Washington Jr. 18; Rebs: Bonga 7 Asts: C. Jones 5 PIR: C. Jones 18	Report	Pts: Bertāns 18; Rebs: Bertāns, Dangubić 4 Asts: Mason 5 PIR: Bertāns 19	Arena: Belgrade Arena; Attendance: 8,704; Referees: Damir Javor, Tomislav Hordov, Marko Mustapić

==== Finals ====
5 June 2025 G1	Budućnost VOLI (Montenegro)	88–94(OT)	(Serbia) Partizan	Podgorica
21:00	Scoring by quarter: 24–22, 19–13, 18–25, 22–23, Overtime: 5–11
Arena Sport	Pts: Ferrell 17; Rebs: Kamenjaš 11; Asts: Ferrell, Sulaimon 5 PIR: Ferrell 18	Report	Pts: Brown 30; Rebs: Bonga 11; Asts: T. Jones, C. Jones 4 PIR: T. Jones 39	Arena: Morača Sports Center; Attendance: 5,250; Referees: Damir Javor, Milan Nedović, Dragan Porobić

7 June 2025 G2	Budućnost VOLI (Montenegro)	84–73	(Serbia) Partizan	Podgorica
21:00	Scoring by quarter: 16–16, 15–25, 25–10, 28–22
Arena Sport	Pts: Omić 15; Rebs: Kamenjaš 11; Asts: Ferrell 5 PIR: Omić 18	Report	Pts: Brown, C. Jones 16; Rebs: Bonga 7 Asts: C. Jones 4 PIR: C. Jones 21	Arena: Morača Sports Center; Attendance: 4,750; Referees: Sašo Petek, Josip Radojković, Mario Majkić

10 June 2025 G3	Partizan (Serbia)	83–67	(Montenegro) Budućnost VOLI	Belgrade
20:00	Scoring by quarter: 24–19, 25–18, 18–22, 16–8
Arena Sport	Pts: C. Jones, Lundberg 14; Rebs: T. Jones 10; Asts: T. Jones, Mike 3 PIR: T. Jones 21	Report	Pts: Sulaimon 20; Rebs: Kamenjaš 8 Asts: Ferrell 4 PIR: Sulaimon 22	Arena: Belgrade Arena; Attendance: 19,352; Referees: Saša Pukl, Tomislav Hordov, Luka Kardum

12 June 2025 G4	Partizan (Serbia)	90–75	(Montenegro) Budućnost VOLI	Belgrade
20:00	Scoring by quarter: 26–26, 22–18, 22–15, 20–16
Arena Sport	Pts: Brown, Davies 18; Rebs: Bonga 8 Asts: C. Jones 9 PIR: C. Jones 26	Report	Pts: Ferrell 23; Rebs: Kamenjaš 7 Asts: Ferrell 5 PIR: Ferrell 28	Arena: Belgrade Arena; Attendance: 21,434; Referees: Damir Javor, Milan Nedović, Dragan Porobić

== EuroLeague ==
=== Regular season ===
Pos	Team	Pld	W	L	PF	PA	PD	Qualification
10	(Basketball Federation of Serbia) Crvena zvezda Meridianbet	34	18	16	2776	2714	+62	Qualification to play-in
11	(Italian Basketball Federation) EA7 Emporio Armani Milan	34	17	17	2896	2934	−38	
12	(Basketball Federation of Serbia) Partizan Mozzart Bet	34	16	18	2780	2724	+56	
13	(Lithuanian Basketball Federation) Žalgiris	34	15	19	2626	2669	−43	
14	(Spanish Basketball Federation) Baskonia	34	14	20	2795	2830	−35	

Source: EuroLeague
Rules for classification: Regular season tiebreakers

=== Matches ===
Win Loss

3 October 2024 1	Baskonia Vitoria-Gasteiz (Spain)	88–82	(Serbia) Partizan	Vitoria-Gasteiz
20:30	Scoring by quarter: 16–17, 16–21, 27–22, 29–22
Sport Klub	Pts: Howard 17; Rebs: Sedekerskis 6 Asts: Forrest, Moneke 4 PIR: Sedekerskis 21	Report	Pts: T. Jones 22; Rebs: T. Jones, Bonga, Marinković 4 Asts: C. Jones 6 PIR: T. Jones 28	Arena: Fernando Buesa Arena; Attendance: 10,127; Referees: Robert Lottermoser, Piotr Pastusiak, Joseph Bissang

10 October 2024 2	Real Madrid (Spain)	93–86	(Serbia) Partizan	Madrid
20:45	Scoring by quarter: 24–24, 26–23, 18–17, 25–22
Sport Klub	Pts: Ibaka 15; Rebs: Ibaka 7 Asts: Campazzo 11; PIR: Campazzo 22	Report	Pts: C. Jones 15; Rebs: Davies 5 Asts: Bonga 6 PIR: C. Jones, T. Jones 16	Arena: WiZink Center; Attendance: 8,623; Referees: Emin Mogulkoc, Milan Nedović, Tomasz Trawicki

15 October 2024 3	Partizan (Serbia)	86–78	(Germany) FC Bayern Munich	Belgrade
20:45	Scoring by quarter: 24–15, 25–17, 22–20, 15–26
Sport Klub	Pts: Brown 22; Rebs: C. Jones 5 Asts: Davies 4 PIR: C. Jones 19	Report	Pts: Obst 15; Rebs: Weiler-Babb 6 Asts: Weiler-Babb, Napier 3 PIR: Obst 18	Arena: Belgrade Arena; Attendance: 20,111; Referees: Carmelo Paternicò, Robert Vyklicky, Guido Giovannetti

17 October 2024 4	Maccabi Playtika Tel Aviv (Israel)	79–91	(Serbia) Partizan	Belgrade
20:05	Scoring by quarter: 27–28, 19–14, 18–24, 15–25
Sport Klub	Pts: Randolph 19; Rebs: Blatt 9 Asts: Blatt 9 PIR: Blatt 26	Report	Pts: Brown 20; Rebs: T. Jones 5 Asts: C. Jones 6 PIR: Brown 23	Arena: Aleksandar Nikolić Hall; Attendance: 650; Referees: Carlos Peruga, Josip Radojković, Hugues Thepenier

23 October 2024 5	Partizan (Serbia)	69–70	(Italy) Virtus Segafredo Bologna	Belgrade
20:30	Scoring by quarter: 20–15, 17–17, 24–25, 8–13
Sport Klub	Pts: T. Jones 20; Rebs: T. Jones, Bonga 6 Asts: Bonga 4 PIR: T. Jones 32	Report	Pts: Clyburn 27; Rebs: Cordinier 10; Asts: Cordinier, Morgan 3 PIR: Cordinier 24	Arena: Belgrade Arena; Attendance: 19,851; Referees: Miguel Angel Perez, Juan Carlos Garcia, Kristaps Konstantinovs

30 October 2024 6	Partizan (Serbia)	74–79	(France) AS Monaco	Belgrade
20:45	Scoring by quarter: 21–23, 12–23, 23–15, 18–18
Sport Klub	Pts: C. Jones, Lundberg 15; Rebs: Bonga, T. Jones 10; Asts: C. Jones 4 PIR: Bonga 22	Report	Pts: Diallo 18; Rebs: Diallo 6 Asts: James 4 PIR: Diallo 21	Arena: Aleksandar Nikolić Hall; Attendance: 7,494; Referees: Emilio Pérez Pizarro, Ioannis Foufis, Carlos Cortés

1 November 2024 7	Fenerbahçe Beko Istanbul (Turkey)	89–72	(Serbia) Partizan	Istanbul
18:45	Scoring by quarter: 22–15, 23–16, 23–22, 22–19
Sport Klub	Pts: Hayes-Davis 24; Rebs: Melli, Biberović, Colson 5 Asts: Baldwin IV 8 PIR: Hayes-Davis 23	Report	Pts: Ntilikina 14; Rebs: Pokuševski 5 Asts: Ntilikina, C. Jones, Lundberg 3 PIR: Pokuševski 14	Arena: Ülker Sports and Event Hall; Attendance: 12,710; Referees: Gytis Vilius, Jordi Aliaga Solé, Alberto Baena Arroyo

7 November 2024 8	Paris Basketball (France)	74–71	(Serbia) Partizan	Paris
20:45	Scoring by quarter: 21–16, 16–19, 19–22, 18–14
Sport Klub	Pts: Hifi 17; Rebs: Jantunen 8 Asts: T. J. Shorts 8 PIR: Hifi 18	Report	Pts: C. Jones 20; Rebs: T. Jones 10; Asts: C. Jones 10; PIR: C. Jones 32	Arena: Adidas Arena; Attendance: 6,393; Referees: Carlos Peruga, Piotr Pastusiak, Christian Theis

13 November 2024 9	Partizan (Serbia)	79–87	(Spain) FC Barcelona	Belgrade
18:00	Scoring by quarter: 23–19, 12–30, 23–21, 21–17
Sport Klub	Pts: C. Jones 17; Rebs: T. Jones 8 Asts: C. Jones, Davies 3 PIR: Pokuševski 15	Report	Pts: Punter 18; Rebs: Metu 8 Asts: Satoranský 9 PIR: Parker 22	Arena: Belgrade Arena; Attendance: 19,669; Referees: Emin Moğulkoç, Seffi Shemmesh, Kristaps Konstantinovs

15 November 2024 10	Partizan (Serbia)	81–88	(Italy) EA7 Emporio Armani Milan	Belgrade
20:30	Scoring by quarter: 22–19, 20–19, 23–26, 16–24
Sport Klub	Pts: Davies, Brown 17; Rebs: Brown 9 Asts: Ntilikina 4 PIR: Brown 24	Report	Pts: Mirotić 19; Rebs: Mirotić 9 Asts: Mannion 7 PIR: Mirotić 27	Arena: Belgrade Arena; Attendance: 18,871; Referees: Miguel Angel Perez, Ioannis Foufis, Sergio Silva

21 November 2024 11	Crvena zvezda Meridianbet (Serbia)	77–89	(Serbia) Partizan	Belgrade
20:00	Scoring by quarter: 21–19, 18–26, 16–18, 22–26
Sport Klub	Pts: Petrušev 20; Rebs: Petrušev 8 Asts: Miller-McIntyre 9 PIR: Petrušev 23	Report	Pts: C. Jones 21; Rebs: Ntilikina 7 Asts: Ntilikina, C. Jones, Lundberg 4 PIR: C. Jones 27	Arena: Belgrade Arena; Attendance: 20,654; Referees: Mehdi Difallah, Emilio Pérez Pizarro, Arturas Sukys

28 November 2024 12	Partizan (Serbia)	78–70	(Greece) Olympiacos Piraeus	Belgrade
20:30	Scoring by quarter: 16–25, 22–11, 12–21, 28–13
Sport Klub	Pts: C. Jones 15; Rebs: Davies, Koprivica 5 Asts: C. Jones 8 PIR: C. Jones 25	Report	Pts: Fournier 16; Rebs: Milutinov, Peters 8 Asts: Fournier, Walkup, Williams-Goss, Vildoza 3 PIR: Milutinov 23	Arena: Belgrade Arena; Attendance: 19,815; Referees: Carlos Peruga, Oļegs Latiševs, Rain Peerandi

3 December 2024 13	Partizan (Serbia)	84–78	(Lithuania) Žalgiris Kaunas	Belgrade
20:30	Scoring by quarter: 22–19, 22–22, 20–23, 20–14
Sport Klub	Pts: C. Jones 19; Rebs: T. Jones 9 Asts: C. Jones 10; PIR: T. Jones 30	Report	Pts: Walker IV 26; Rebs: Francisco, Smailagić 6 Asts: Ulanovas 3 PIR: Walker IV 25	Arena: Belgrade Arena; Attendance: 19,366; Referees: Sreten Radović, Juan Carlos Garcia, Robert Vyklicky

5 December 2024 14	Partizan (Serbia)	91–73	(Greece) Panathinaikos AKTOR Athens	Belgrade
20:30	Scoring by quarter: 20–20, 24–22, 20–12, 27–24
Sport Klub	Pts: C. Jones 18; Rebs: T. Jones 10; Asts: C. Jones 4 PIR: T. Jones, Brown 19	Report	Pts: Sloukas 15; Rebs: Lessort, Hernangómez 6 Asts: Sloukas 6 PIR: Lessort 22	Arena: Belgrade Arena; Attendance: 19,680; Referees: Miguel Angel Perez, Piotr Pastusiak, Seffi Shemmesh

12 December 2024 15	Alba Berlin (Germany)	90–91	(Serbia) Partizan	Berlin
19:00	Scoring by quarter: 28–30, 18–21, 18–23, 26–17
Sport Klub	Pts: McCormack 16; Rebs: McCormack 6 Asts: Spagnolo 6 PIR: McCormack 20	Report	Pts: C. Jones 24; Rebs: T. Jones 7 Asts: C. Jones 6 PIR: C. Jones 33	Arena: Uber Arena; Attendance: 9,290; Referees: Emin Mogulkoc, Jordi Aliaga, Sergio Silva

17 December 2024 16	Partizan (Serbia)	79–82	(France) LDLC ASVEL Villeurbanne	Belgrade
20:45	Scoring by quarter: 21–24, 24–15, 20–27, 14–16
Sport Klub	Pts: Washington Jr. 22; Rebs: T. Jones 6 Asts: Washington Jr. 8 PIR: Washington Jr. 22	Report	Pts: Maledon 21; Rebs: Sako, Lauvergne 9 Asts: Maledon 5 PIR: Maledon, Lauvergne 24	Arena: Belgrade Arena; Attendance: 18,063; Referees: Carlos Peruga, Jakub Zamojski, Tomasz Trawicki

20 December 2024 17	Anadolu Efes Istanbul (Turkey)	86–77	(Serbia) Partizan	Istanbul
18:30	Scoring by quarter: 20–27, 13–11, 25–23, 28–16
Sport Klub	Pts: Osmani 25; Rebs: Osmani 6 Asts: Thompson 11; PIR: Osmani 29	Report	Pts: T. Jones 23; Rebs: Davies 6 Asts: Pokuševski 5 PIR: T. Jones 26	Arena: Basketball Development Centre; Attendance: 9,430; Referees: Robert Lottermoser, Emilio Pérez Pizarro, Leandro Lezcano

27 December 2024 18	Partizan (Serbia)	90–81	(Turkey) Fenerbahçe Beko Istanbul	Belgrade
20:30	Scoring by quarter: 25–21, 22–17, 18–19, 25–24
Sport Klub	Pts: Washington 27; Rebs: Mike 7 Asts: C. Jones 5 PIR: Washington 27	Report	Pts: Hayes-Davis 19; Rebs: Colson 4 Asts: Hall 8 PIR: Hayes-Davis 26	Arena: Belgrade Arena; Attendance: 19,624; Referees: Mehdi Difallah, Piotr Pastusiak, Robert Vyklicky

3 January 2025 19	Partizan (Serbia)	98–75	(Israel) Maccabi Playtika Tel Aviv	Belgrade
20:30	Scoring by quarter: 27–12, 21–20, 22–15, 28–28
Sport Klub	Pts: Brown 21; Rebs: T. Jones, Bonga 5 Asts: C. Jones 8 PIR: Brown 25	Report	Pts: Blatt 16; Rebs: Williams, Rayman 9 Asts: Jokubaitis 4 PIR: Hoard 15	Arena: Belgrade Arena; Attendance: 19,809; Referees: Emin Mogulkoc, Carmelo Paternicò, Saulius Racys

9 January 2025 20	Panathinaikos AKTOR Athens (Greece)	96–84	(Serbia) Partizan	Athens
20:15	Scoring by quarter: 23–13, 26–25, 26–25, 21–21
Sport Klub	Pts: Nunn 25; Rebs: Yurtseven, Hernangómez 8 Asts: Grant 8 PIR: Grant 33	Report	Pts: Brown 23; Rebs: T. Jones 8 Asts: Lundberg 7 PIR: Lundberg 24	Arena: O.A.C.A. Olympic Indoor Hall; Attendance: 18,612; Referees: Miguel Angel Perez, Rain Peerandi, Arturas Sukys

14 January 2025 21	LDLC ASVEL Villeurbanne (France)	62–93	(Serbia) Partizan	Lyon
20:00	Scoring by quarter: 20–31, 14–14, 9–29, 19–19
Sport Klub	Pts: Ajinça 14; Rebs: Roberson, Black 6 Asts: Maledon 5 PIR: Maledon, Ajinça 13	Report	Pts: T. Jones 22; Rebs: Koprivica 7 Asts: C. Jones 9 PIR: T. Jones 30	Arena: LDLC Arena; Attendance: 8,215; Referees: Carlos Peruga, Ioannis Foufis, Eduard Udyanskyy

16 January 2025 22	EA7 Emporio Armani Milan (Italy)	70–90	(Serbia) Partizan	Milan
20:30	Scoring by quarter: 17–17, 23–20, 18–27, 12–26
Sport Klub	Pts: Mirotić, Shields 16; Rebs: Mirotić 6 Asts: Bolmaro 5 PIR: Bolmaro 21	Report	Pts: Brown 26; Rebs: Brown, T. Jones 7 Asts: C. Jones 9 PIR: C. Jones 37	Arena: Unipol Forum; Attendance: 9,903; Referees: Robert Lottermoser, Piotr Pastusiak, Amit Balak

22 January 2025 23	Partizan (Serbia)	92–86	(France) Paris Basketball	Belgrade
20:30	Scoring by quarter: 26–34, 28–15, 20–20, 18–17
Sport Klub	Pts: C. Jones 17; Rebs: Bonga 7 Asts: Lundberg 7 PIR: Bonga 28	Report	Pts: Shorts 19; Rebs: Ward, Jantunen 4 Asts: Lo 4 PIR: Shorts, Ward 19	Arena: Belgrade Arena; Attendance: 19,766; Referees: Juan Carlos Garcia, Oļegs Latiševs, Tomasz Trawicki

31 January 2025 24	Partizan (Serbia)	71–73	(Serbia) Crvena zvezda Meridianbet	Belgrade
20:30	Scoring by quarter: 18–21, 19–21, 16–13, 18–18
Sport Klub	Pts: C. Jones 20; Rebs: Davies 8 Asts: C. Jones, Lundberg 3 PIR: C. Jones 19	Report	Pts: Petrušev 17; Rebs: Petrušev, Bolomboy 8 Asts: Miller-McIntyre 6 PIR: Petrušev 25	Arena: Belgrade Arena; Attendance: 20,366; Referees: Mehdi Difallah, Emilio Pérez Pizarro, Saulius Racys

5 February 2025 25	Virtus Segafredo Bologna (Italy)	71–81	(Serbia) Partizan	Bologna
20:30	Scoring by quarter: 23–17, 13–27, 21–22, 14–15
Sport Klub	Pts: Shengelia 16; Rebs: Cordinier, Shengelia 5 Asts: Shengelia 8 PIR: Shengelia 26	Report	Pts: Brown 20; Rebs: T. Jones 12; Asts: Lundberg 6 PIR: T. Jones 20	Arena: Virtus Segafredo Arena; Attendance: 7,967; Referees: Emin Mogulkoc, Seffi Shemmesh, Eduard Udyanskyy

7 February 2025 26	AS Monaco (France)	69–86	(Serbia) Partizan	Monaco
19:00	Scoring by quarter: 18–21, 22–27, 15–14, 14–24
Sport Klub	Pts: Calathes 14; Rebs: Calathes, Diallo 6 Asts: Calathes, James 6 PIR: Calathes, James 13	Report	Pts: Brown 18; Rebs: T. Jones 7 Asts: C. Jones 6 PIR: T. Jones 26	Arena: Salle Gaston Médecin; Attendance: 4,524; Referees: Miguel Angel Perez, Carlos Cortés, Vasiliki Tsaroucha

28 February 2025 27	Partizan (Serbia)	86–73	(Spain) Baskonia Vitoria-Gasteiz	Belgrade
20:30	Scoring by quarter: 25–18, 20–7, 18–26, 23–22
Sport Klub	Pts: C. Jones 21; Rebs: T. Jones 9 Asts: C. Jones 6 PIR: C. Jones 31	Report	Pts: Luwawu-Cabarrot, Rogkavopoulos 11; Rebs: Rogkavopoulos, Diop, Forrest 7 Asts: Forrest 6 PIR: Forrest 14	Arena: Belgrade Arena; Attendance: 16,151; Referees: Mehdi Difallah, Oļegs Latiševs, Gytis Vilius

7 March 2025 28	Olympiacos Piraeus (Greece)	82–70	(Serbia) Partizan	Piraeus
20:15	Scoring by quarter: 27–18, 19–14, 18–19, 18–19
Sport Klub	Pts: Vezenkov 17; Rebs: Milutinov 9 Asts: Vildoza, Williams-Goss, Milutinov, Fournier 4 PIR: Milutinov 23	Report	Pts: C. Jones 17; Rebs: Davies 5 Asts: C. Jones 4 PIR: C. Jones 20	Arena: Peace and Friendship Stadium; Attendance: 12,349; Referees: Carlos Peruga, Emilio Pérez Pizarro, Maxime Boubert

14 March 2025 29	FC Barcelona (Spain)	87–80	(Serbia) Partizan	Barcelona
20:45	Scoring by quarter: 25–32, 29–9, 19–26, 14–13
Sport Klub	Pts: Punter 25; Rebs: Hernangómez 8 Asts: Punter 4 PIR: Punter 29	Report	Pts: Mike, Brown 16; Rebs: T. Jones 9 Asts: C. Jones 9 PIR: Mike 19	Arena: Palau Blaugrana; Attendance: Emin Mogulkoc, Piotr Pastusiak, Rain Peerandi; Referees: 6,551

21 March 2025 30	Partizan (Serbia)	65–97	(Turkey) Anadolu Efes Istanbul	Belgrade
20:45	Scoring by quarter: 18–24, 15–30, 12–19, 20–24
Sport Klub	Pts: T. Jones, Bonga, Ntilikina 11; Rebs: C. Jones, Davies 5 Asts: C. Jones 3 PIR: T. Jones 12	Report	Pts: Thompson 19; Rebs: Bryant, Oturu, Osmani 5 Asts: Osmani 4 PIR: Thompson 25	Arena: Belgrade Arena; Attendance: 20,073; Referees: Mehdi Difallah, Ioannis Foufis, Gytis Vilius

25 March 2025 31	Partizan (Serbia)	85–71	(Germany) Alba Berlin	Belgrade
20:45	Scoring by quarter: 13–14, 27–20, 21–22, 24–15
Sport Klub	Pts: Davies 22; Rebs: Brown 7 Asts: C. Jones 9 PIR: Davies 28	Report	Pts: Thomas 16; Rebs: Schneider 6 Asts: Hermannsson 13; PIR: Thomas 15	Arena: Belgrade Arena; Attendance: 18,804; Referees: Carmelo Paternicò, Saulius Račys, Marcin Kowalski

27 March 2025 32	FC Bayern Munich (Germany)	89–74	(Serbia) Partizan	Munich
20:30	Scoring by quarter: 21–23, 11–11, 23–19, 24–11
Sport Klub	Pts: Edwards 25; Rebs: Weiler-Babb, Napier 5 Asts: Napier 6 PIR: Edwards 22	Report	Pts: C. Jones 19; Rebs: T. Jones 6 Asts: C. Jones 10; PIR: C. Jones 24	Arena: SAP Garden; Attendance: 11,200; Referees: Miguel Angel Perez, Jordi Aliaga, Guido Giovannetti

3 April 2025 33	Žalgiris Kaunas (Lithuania)	70–66	(Serbia) Partizan	Kaunas
19:00	Scoring by quarter: 24–21, 11–19, 14–9, 21–17
Arena Sport	Pts: Francisco 15; Rebs: Brazdeikis 8 Asts: Brazdeikis 5 PIR: Smailagić 16	Report	Pts: C. Jones 23; Rebs: Davies, Bonga 6 Asts: C. Jones 4 PIR: C. Jones 18	Arena: Žalgiris Arena; Attendance: 14,814; Referees: Carlos Peruga, Oļegs Latiševs, Alberto Baena

10 April 2025 34	Partizan (Serbia)	89–91	(Spain) Real Madrid	Belgrade
20:30	Scoring by quarter: 24–22, 22–26, 28–17, 15–26
Arena Sport	Pts: Davies 22; Rebs: Bonga 11; Asts: C. Jones 6 PIR: Davies 22	Report	Pts: Musa 15; Rebs: Ibaka 10; Asts: Campazzo 7 PIR: Campazzo 23	Arena: Belgrade Arena; Attendance: 19,212; Referees: Mehdi Difallah, Saulius Racys, Michele Rossi

== Serbian SuperLeague ==
=== Depth chart ===
Pos.	Starting 5	Bench	Inactive
C	Balša Koprivica		Aleksa Dimitrijević
PF	Isiaha Mike	Aleksej Pokuševski	Isaac Bonga
SF	Mitar Bošnjaković	Uroš Mijailović	Mario Nakić (injured)
SG	Arijan Lakić	Uroš Danilović	Vanja Marinković
PG	Duane Washington	Đorđe Šekularac	Frank Ntilikina (injured)

=== Matches ===
Win Loss

==== Semifinals ====
15 June 2025 G1	Partizan	84–74	FMP Soccerbet	Belgrade
20:30	Scoring by quarter: 8–16, 21–21, 26–19, 29–18
Arena Sport	Pts: Washington 40; Rebs: Mike 13; Asts: Washington 5 PIR: Washington 40	Boxscore	Pts: Barna 16; Rebs: Radosavljević 11; Asts: Radosavljević 5 PIR: Gašić 20	Arena: Aleksandar Nikolić Hall; Attendance: 1,803; Referees: Milivoje Jovčić, Vladimir Jevtović, Nemanja Vlahović

17 June 2025 G2	FMP Soccerbet	78–69	Partizan	Belgrade
19:00	Scoring by quarter: 17–16, 17–15, 25–13, 19–25
Arena Sport	Pts: Barna 18; Rebs: Radosavljević, Lazarević 7 Asts: Radosavljević 7 PIR: Radosavljević 18	Boxscore	Pts: Washington 25; Rebs: Koprivica 15; Asts: Koprivica, Lakić 3 PIR: Koprivica 26	Arena: Železnik Hall; Attendance: 750; Referees: Uroš Obrknežević, Stefan Čalić, Siniša Prpa

19 June 2025 G3	Partizan	90–80	FMP Soccerbet	Belgrade
20:00	Scoring by quarter: 23–23, 30–22, 19–17, 18–18
Arena Sport	Pts: Koprivica 26; Rebs: Koprivica, Mike 10; Asts: Lakić 9 PIR: Koprivica 36	Boxscore	Pts: Tomašević 17; Rebs: Gašić 6 Asts: Šaranović 6 PIR: Tomašević 19	Arena: Aleksandar Nikolić Hall; Attendance: 2,354; Referees: Milivoje Jovčić, Uroš Obrknežević, Petar Pešić

==== Finals ====
22 June 2025 G1	Partizan	94–74	Spartak Office Shoes	Belgrade
21:00	Scoring by quarter: 28–23, 26–19, 25–19, 15–13
Arena Sport	Pts: Washington 23; Rebs: Koprivica 11; Asts: Pokuševski 9 PIR: Washington, Koprivica 24	Boxscore	Pts: Miletić 11; Rebs: Gordić 7 Asts: Gordić 10; PIR: Gordić 16	Arena: Aleksandar Nikolić Hall; Attendance: 4,561; Referees: Uroš Nikolić, Marko Juras, Vladimir Jevtović

24 June 2025 G2	Spartak Office Shoes	79–93	Partizan	Subotica
20:30	Scoring by quarter: 24–19, 20–26, 17–27, 18–21
Arena Sport	Pts: Cerovina 22; Rebs: Miletić, Gordić 5 Asts: Gordić 9 PIR: Cerovina 30	Boxscore	Pts: Washington 41; Rebs: Washington 8 Asts: Washington 4 PIR: Washington 43	Arena: Dudova Šuma Hall; Attendance: Milivoje Jovčić, Uroš Obrknežević, Nemanja Vlahović; Referees: 3,000

== Radivoj Korać Cup ==
=== Depth chart ===
Pos.	Starting 5	Bench 1	Bench 2	Bench 3
C	Tyrique Jones	Balša Koprivica	Aleksa Dimitrijević
PF	Aleksej Pokuševski	Vanja Marinković
SF	Sterling Brown	Mario Nakić		Stefan Isailović
SG	Duane Washington	Mitar Bošnjaković		Uroš Danilović
PG	Carlik Jones	Arijan Lakić	Đorđe Šekularac

=== Matches ===
Win Loss

13 February 2025 Quarterfinal	Partizan	85–69	Vojvodina mts	Niš
18:00	Scoring by quarter: 27–19, 10–10, 22–28, 26–12
Arena Sport	Pts: C. Jones 24; Rebs: Pokuševski 6 Asts: C. Jones 7 PIR: C. Jones 39	Report	Pts: Smith 15; Rebs: Rebrača 10; Asts: Ljubičić 4 PIR: Rebrača 21	Arena: Čair Sports Center; Attendance: 4,500; Referees: Uroš Obrknežević, Vladimir Jevtović, Luka Manojlović

14 February 2025 Semifinal	Partizan	83–63	Mega Superbet	Niš
20:00	Scoring by quarter: 31–22, 18–11, 15–18, 19–12
Arena Sport	Pts: Washington 17; Rebs: Pokuševski 6 Asts: C. Jones, Washington, T. Jones 4 PIR: Koprivica 19	Report	Pts: Marković 20; Rebs: Marković 11; Asts: Petrović 8 PIR: Marković 29	Arena: Čair Sports Center; Attendance: 4,400; Referees: Milivoje Jovčić, Vladimir Tomić, Nemanja Ninković

15 February 2025 Final	Crvena zvezda Meridianbet	89–83(OT)	Partizan	Niš
20:45	Scoring by quarter: 16–20, 24–17, 18–20, 19–20, Overtime: 12–6
Arena Sport, RTS 1	Pts: Petrušev 18; Rebs: Petrušev, Bolomboy 7 Asts: Miller-McIntyre 6 PIR: Petrušev 21	Report	Pts: C. Jones 34; Rebs: T. Jones 7 Asts: C. Jones 5 PIR: C. Jones 34	Arena: Čair Sports Center; Attendance: 5,000; Referees: Stefan Ćalić, Uroš Obrknežević, Vladimir Tomić

== Individual awards ==
ABA League

Finals MVP

- (United States) Tyrique Jones

Best Defender

- (Germany) Isaac Bonga

Ideal Starting Five

- (United States) Sterling Brown

MVP of the Round

- (Serbia) Balša Koprivica – Round 9
- (Serbia) Balša Koprivica – Round 24
- (Germany) Isaac Bonga – Round 26
- (Serbia) Aleksej Pokuševski – Quarter-final G1
- (United States) Tyrique Jones – Final G1
- (United States) Tyrique Jones – Final G3
- (South Sudan) Carlik Jones – Final G4

Serbian League

Finals MVP

- (Germany) Duane Washington

Top scorer

- (Germany) Duane Washington

Best Young Player

- (Serbia) Uroš Mijailović

Ideal Starting Five

- (Germany) Duane Washington

MVP of the Round

- (Germany) Duane Washington – Semifinal G1
- (Serbia) Balša Koprivica – Semifinal G3
- (Germany) Duane Washington & (Serbia) Balša Koprivica – Final G1
- (Germany) Duane Washington – Final G2

EuroLeague

MVP of the Round

- (South Sudan) Carlik Jones – Round 22
- (South Sudan) Carlik Jones – Round 27
