= Arijan Lakić =

Serbian basketball player (born 2000)

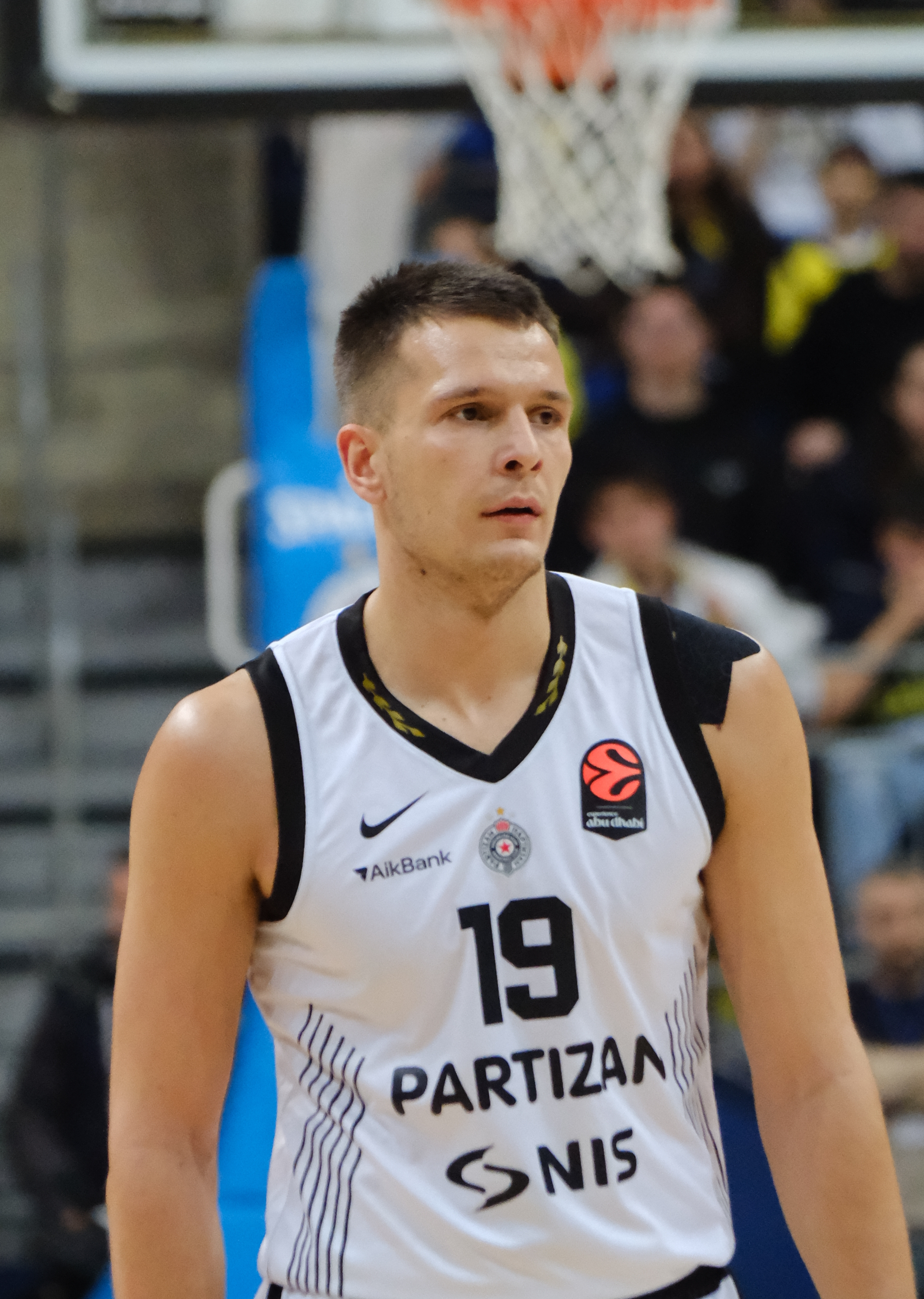
- Lakić with Partizan in 2026

No. 19 – Partizan Belgrade
- Position: Shooting guard / small forward
- League: Serbian SuperLeague; ABA League; EuroLeague

Personal information
- Born: 20 January 2000 (age 26) Belgrade, Serbia, FR Yugoslavia
- Listed height: 1.98 m (6 ft 6 in)
- Listed weight: 95 kg (209 lb)

Career information
- NBA draft: 2022: undrafted
- Playing career: 2018–present

Career history
- 2019–2021: Vrijednosnice Osijek
- 2021: →Borac Čačak
- 2021–2022: →Spars Sarajevo
- 2022–2024: Zadar
- 2024–present: Partizan

Career highlights
- ABA League champion (2025); Serbian League champion (2025); 2× Croatian League champion (2023, 2024); Croatian Cup winner (2024)
Medals
Men's basketball
Representing Serbia
FIBA Europe Under-18 Championship
Gold medal – first place	2018 Latvia	U18 Team

Arijan Lakić (Serbian Cyrillic: Аријан Лакић, born 20 January 2000) is a Serbian professional basketball player for Partizan Belgrade of the Serbian SuperLeague, the ABA League, and the EuroLeague.

== Early career ==
In 2009, Lakić started to play basketball for KK Sava from Belgrade. In Summer 2016, he was added to the Crvena zvezda U18 team. He won the second place at the 2017–18 Junior ABA League season with the Zvezda. Over six season games, he averaged 5.8 points, 3.6 rebounds and 3.8 assists per game.

== Professional career ==
=== Crvena zvezda (2018–2022) ===
On 7 February 2018, Lakić signed a four-year professional contract with Crvena zvezda. Prior to the 2018–19 season, he was loaned out to FMP. Later, he was cut off from the 2018–19 FMP season roster due to back injury. After a 15-month break due to the injury, he was loaned to Vrijednosnice Osijek of the Croatian League for the 2019–20 season in December 2019. O 7 December 2019, Lakić made his professional debut in an 85–74 win over Šibenka. He recorded an assist and 2 steals in 8 minutes of playing time. Through 11 games in the season, Lakić averaged four points, three rebounds, and 2.4 assists per game. In May 2021, Lakić was loaned to Borac Čačak for the 2021 Basketball League of Serbia playoffs. In August 2021, he joined Bosnian club Spars Sarajevo for the 2021–22 season.

=== Zadar (2022–2024) ===
On 21 July 2022, Lakić signed a two-year contract with Croatian club Zadar of the Croatian League and the ABA League. In his first season with Zadar, he averaged 5.9 points, 2.6 rebounds and 2.4 assists per game in ABA League. Arijan Lakić won his first trophy in his first season with Zadar beating 3-0 Split in the Croatian League finals.

=== Partizan (2024–present) ===
On 20 August 2024, Lakić signed with Partizan Mozzart Bet of the Serbian SuperLeague, the ABA League, and the EuroLeague. In his debut season with Partizan, Lakić averaged 1.5 points and 1.7 rebounds over 11 EuroLeague games. During the 2024–25 season, Partizan managed to lift the record eighth ABA League championship, and the Serbian League championship, the first one after 11 seasons.

== National team career ==
Lakić was a member of the Serbian under-18 team that won the gold medal at the 2018 FIBA Europe Under-18 Championship in Latvia. Over seven tournament games, he averaged 3.4 points, 2.7 rebounds and 4.1 assists per game. In 2025, he was called again to play for the Serbian national team, but this time for seniors. He played against Finland and Georgia in Eurobasket qualifications. Lakić averaged 5.5 points, 2 rebounds and 2.5 assists per game.⁰

== Career statistics ==
Legend
GP	Games played	GS	Games started	MPG	Minutes per game
FG%	Field-goal percentage	3P%	3-point field-goal percentage	FT%	Free-throw percentage
RPG	Rebounds per game	APG	Assists per game	SPG	Steals per game
BPG	Blocks per game	PPG	Points per game	PIR	Performance index rating
**Bold**	Career high

=== Euroleague ===
Year	Team	GP	GS	MPG	FG%	3P%	FT%	RPG	APG	SPG	BPG	PPG	PIR
2024–25	Partizan	11	1	11.5	.350	.250	.000	1.7	.3	.2	.0	1.5	1.8
Career		11	1	11.5	.350	.250	.000	1.7	.3	.2	.0	1.5	1.8

== Personal life ==
He was born in Belgrade. His family originates from Benkovac, Croatia.
