= Mitar Bošnjaković =

Serbian basketball player (born 2006)

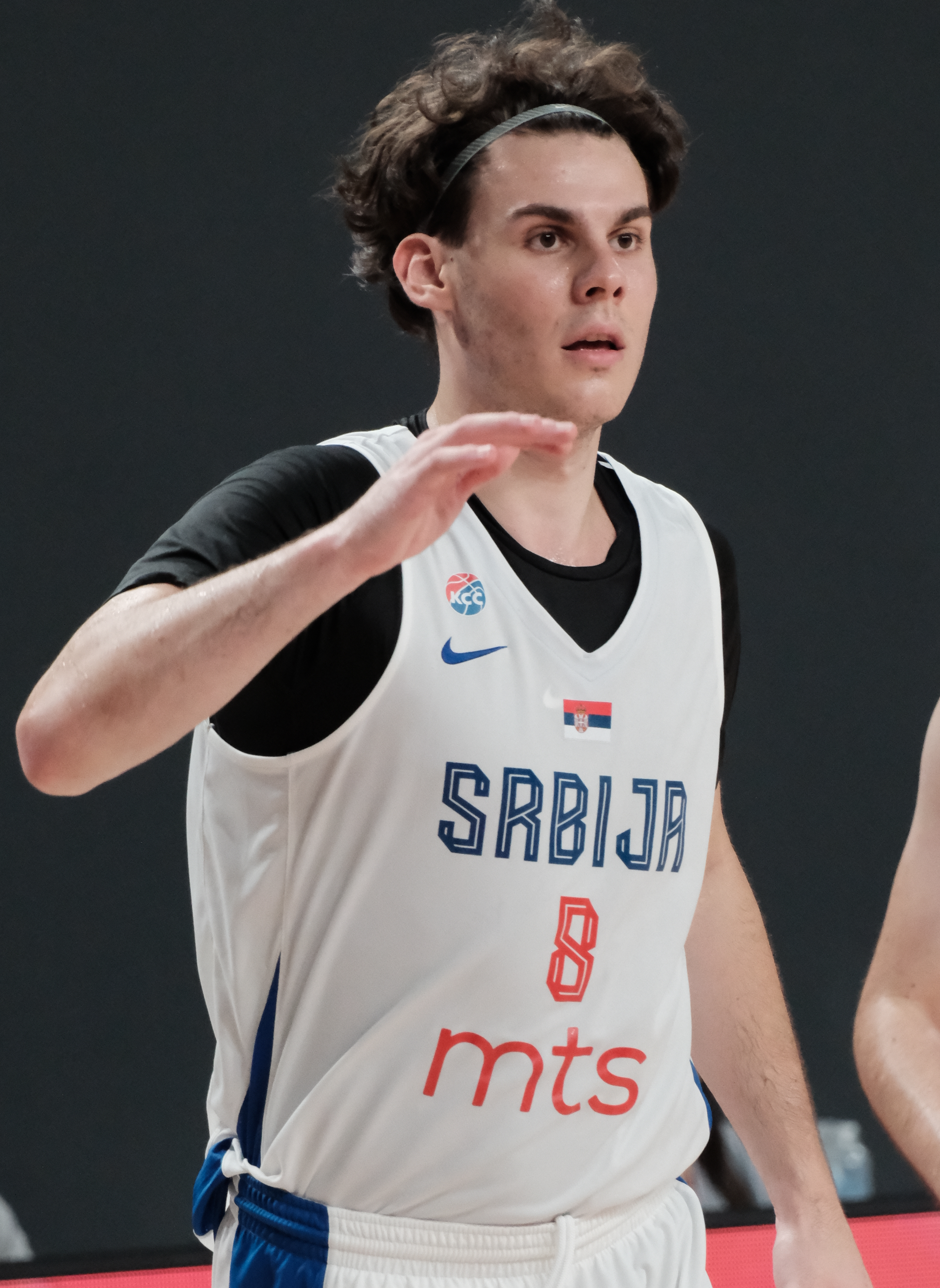
- Bošnjaković with the Serbia U20 national team

Free agent
- Position: Small forward

Personal information
- Born: August 24, 2006 (age 20) Novi Sad, Serbia
- Listed height: 201 cm (6 ft 7 in)
- Listed weight: 94 kg (207 lb)

Career information
- Playing career: 2024–present

Career history
- 2024–2026: Partizan

Career highlights
- ABA League champion (2025); Serbian League champion (2025)
Medals
Men's basketball
Representing Serbia
FIBA U20 EuroBasket
Silver medal – second place	2026 Slovenia	Team
FIBA U18 EuroBasket
Gold medal – first place	2023 Serbia	Team
Silver medal – second place	2024 Finland	Team

Mitar Bošnjaković (Serbian Cyrillic: Митар Бошњаковић; born 24 August 2006) is a Serbian professional basketball player who last played for Partizan Belgrade of the Basketball League of Serbia (KLS), the ABA League, and the EuroLeague.

== Early career ==
He played for youth selections of Real Madrid since season 2021/22.

== Professional career ==
In August 2024, Bošnjaković signed a multi-year contract with Partizan Mozzart Bet. During the 2024–25 season, Partizan managed to lift the record eighth ABA League championship, and the Serbian League championship, the first one after 11 seasons.

== National team career ==
Bošnjaković was a member of the Serbian U18/19 National Team in 2024.

== Career statistics ==
Legend
GP	Games played	GS	Games started	MPG	Minutes per game
FG%	Field-goal percentage	3P%	3-point field-goal percentage	FT%	Free-throw percentage
RPG	Rebounds per game	APG	Assists per game	SPG	Steals per game
BPG	Blocks per game	PPG	Points per game	PIR	Performance index rating
**Bold**	Career high

=== Euroleague ===
Year	Team	GP	GS	MPG	FG%	3P%	FT%	RPG	APG	SPG	BPG	PPG	PIR
2024–25	Partizan	4	3	8.9	.417	.000	.000	1.0	.8	.8	.0	2.5	1.2
Career		4	3	8.9	.417	.000	.000	1.0	.8	.8	.0	2.5	1.2
