= Aleksa Dimitrijević =

Serbian basketball player (born 2006)

No. 27 – Tulsa Golden Hurricane
- Position: Center / power forward
- League: American Conference

Personal information
- Born: 30 May 2006 (age 20) Belgrade, Serbia
- Listed height: 216 cm (7 ft 1 in)
- Listed weight: 108 kg (238 lb)

Career information
- College: Creighton (2025–2026); Tulsa (2026–present)
- Playing career: 2024–present

Career history
- 2024–2025: Partizan

Career highlights
- ABA League champion (2025); Serbian League champion (2025)
Medals
Men's basketball
Representing Serbia
FIBA U18 EuroBasket
Silver medal – second place	2024 Finland	Team

Aleksa Dimitrijević (Serbian Cyrillic: Алекса Димитријевић; born 30 May 2006) is a Serbian college basketball player for the Tulsa Golden Hurricane of the American Conference.

== Early career ==
He joined BC Partizan 2022. He has been involved in sports programs since the age of four. Judo, swimming and football. He started training basketball at the age of ten.

== Professional career ==
On 30 May 2024, Dimitrijević made his professional debut for Partizan in a KLS match against Mega. Dimitrijević scored eight points. During the 2024–25 season, Partizan managed to lift the record eighth ABA League championship, and the Serbian League championship, the first one after 11 seasons.

== National team career ==
He is a member of Serbian U18/19 National Team 2024.
