= Isiaha Mike =

Canadian basketball player (born 1997)

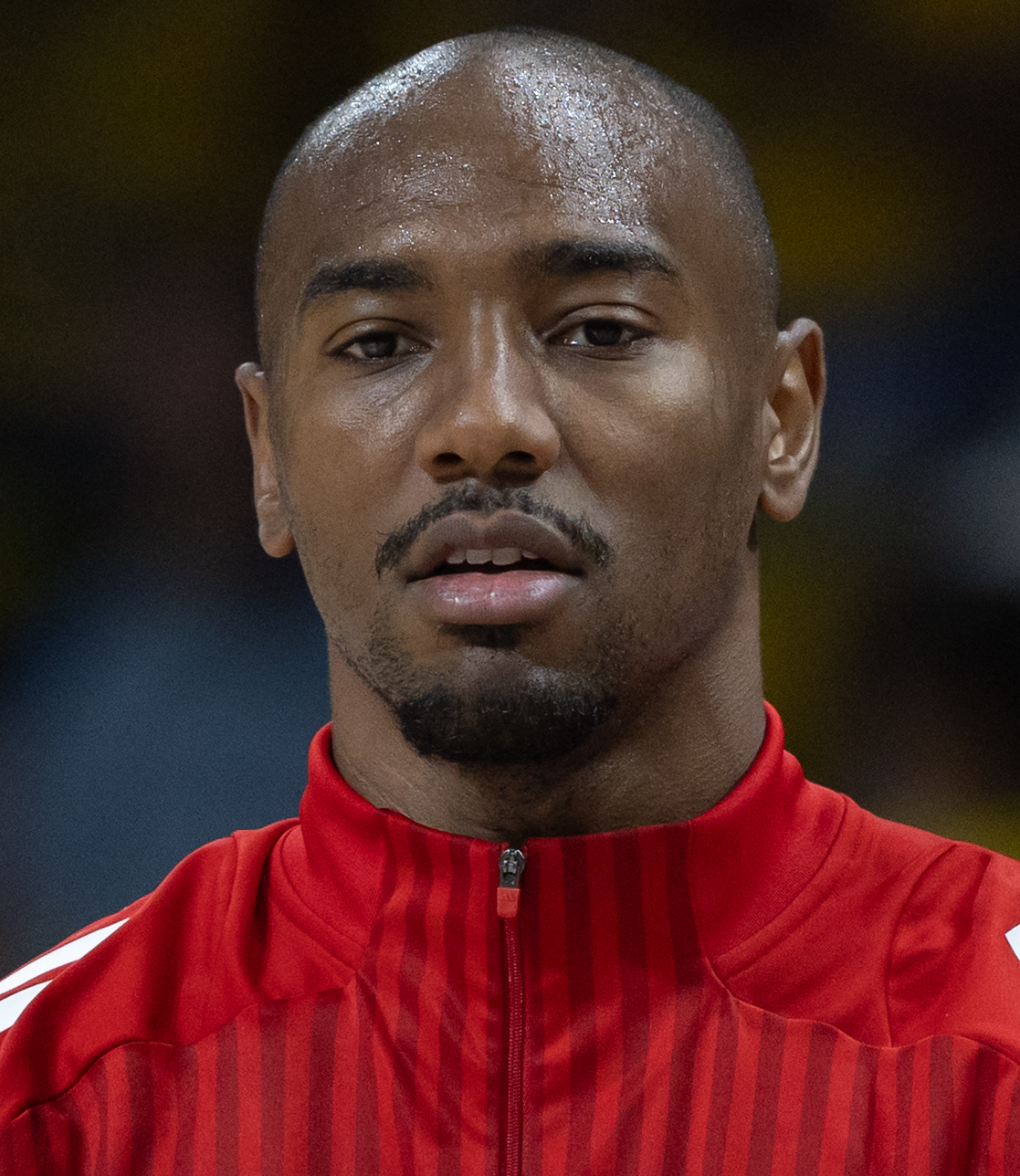
- Mike with Bayern Munich in 2026

No. 24 – Bahçeşehir Koleji
- Position: Power forward / small forward
- League: BSL; EuroCup

Personal information
- Born: August 11, 1997 (age 29) Toronto, Ontario, Canada
- Listed height: 6 ft 8 in (2.03 m)
- Listed weight: 215 lb (98 kg)

Career information
- High school: Trinity International (Las Vegas, Nevada)
- College: Duquesne (2016–2017); SMU (2018–2020)
- NBA draft: 2020: undrafted
- Playing career: 2020–present

Career history
- 2020–2022: Niners Chemnitz
- 2022, 2023: Scarborough Shooting Stars
- 2022–2024: JL Bourg
- 2024–2025: Partizan
- 2025–2026: Bayern Munich
- 2026–present: Bahçeşehir Koleji

Career highlights
- All-EuroCup First Team (2024); All-LNB Élite First Team (2024); ABA League champion (2025); Serbian League champion (2025); CEBL champion (2023); CEBL Finals MVP (2023); All-CEBL First-team (2022); CEBL All-Canadian Team (2022); Third-team All-AAC (2020); Atlantic 10 All-Rookie Team (2017)

Isiaha Mike (born August 11, 1997) is a Canadian professional basketball player for Bahçeşehir Koleji of the Turkish Basketbol Süper Ligi (BSL) and the EuroCup. He played college basketball for the Duquesne Dukes and the SMU Mustangs.

== Early life ==
Mike grew up in Scarborough, Toronto. As a middle schooler, Mike stood 6'5 and spent much time in the gymnasium to compensate for his lack of basketball skills. He played pick-up basketball in middle school but switched his focus to academics while attending West Hill Collegiate Institute in Scarborough, Toronto. Mike played for Hoops Canada Elite on the Amateur Athletic Union (AAU) circuit. In August 2014, he won most valuable player of the Americas Team Camp. He later transferred to Trinity International School in Las Vegas, Nevada under head coach Greg Lockridge. He averaged 27.6 points, 14.3 rebounds, 3.1 assists and 1.9 steals per game as a senior. He led his team to a second straight National Christian School Athletic Association title game and was named to the All-Tournament Team. Mike played in the BioSteel All-Canadian Game in April 2016. North Pole Hoops ranked him the third-best Canadian player in the 2016 class behind Thon Maker and Justin Jackson.

== College career ==
Mike played for Duquesne in his freshman season. He averaged 11.3 points and 5.8 rebounds per game and was named to the Atlantic 10 All-Rookie Team. After the season, he was granted a release from the program following the departure of head coach Jim Ferry. Mike transferred to SMU during his official visit, turning down an offer from Oregon. He sat out one season due to National Collegiate Athletic Association transfer rules and was a member of the scout team during practice. At first, Mike was frustrated with his role, arguing with the coaching staff, but matured with the help of his teammate Jarrey Foster. On January 30, 2019, he scored a career-high 25 points and grabbed seven rebounds in an 85–83 loss to Wichita State. Mike finished the season averaging 11.7 points, 5.4 rebounds, 1.7 assists and 1.1 blocks per game. As a junior, Mike matched his career-high of 25 points, all of which came after the first half, and grabbed 12 rebounds in an 87–85 double overtime loss to Georgia on December 20. In his junior season, he averaged 14 points, 6.3 rebounds, 1.8 assists and 1.4 steals per game and was named to the Third Team All-American Athletic Conference. Mike announced that he would remain in the 2020 NBA draft and forgo his senior season.

== Professional career ==
=== Niners Chemnitz (2020–2022) ===
On August 31, 2020, Mike signed his first professional contract with Niners Chemnitz of the German Basketball Bundesliga. He averaged 10.5 points and 5.2 rebounds per game. On July 3, 2021, Mike re-signed with the team.

=== Scarborough Shooting Stars (2022–2023) ===
On May 29, 2022, Mike signed with the Scarborough Shooting Stars of the CEBL.

=== JL Bourg (2022–2024) ===
On June 30, 2022, Mike signed with JL Bourg of the French LNB Pro A.

=== Partizan (2024–2025) ===
On August 20, 2024, Mike signed with Partizan Mozzart Bet of the ABA League, Basketball League of Serbia (KLS) and the EuroLeague. During the 2024–25 season, Partizan managed to lift the record eighth ABA League championship, and the Serbian League championship, the first one after 11 seasons.

=== Bayern Munich (2025–2026) ===
On August 25, 2025, Mike signed with Bayern Munich of the German Basketball Bundesliga (BBL) and the EuroLeague until 2027.

=== Bahçeşehir Koleji (2026–present) ===
On July 1, 2026, Mike signed a one–year contract with Bahçeşehir Koleji of the Turkish Basketbol Süper Ligi (BSL).

== Career statistics ==
Legend
GP	Games played	GS	Games started	MPG	Minutes per game
FG%	Field-goal percentage	3P%	3-point field-goal percentage	FT%	Free-throw percentage
RPG	Rebounds per game	APG	Assists per game	SPG	Steals per game
BPG	Blocks per game	PPG	Points per game	PIR	Performance index rating
**Bold**	Career high

=== College ===
Year	Team	GP	GS	MPG	FG%	3P%	FT%	RPG	APG	SPG	BPG	PPG
2016–17	Duquesne	**32**	**32**	28.4	.434	.333	.667	5.8	1.6	.8	.8	11.3
2017–18	SMU	Redshirt										
2018–19	SMU	**32**	**32**	**30.7**	.453	.368	.763	5.4	1.7	.9	**1.1**	11.7
2019–20	SMU	30	30	**30.7**	**.481**	**.377**	**.805**	**6.3**	**1.8**	**1.4**	.6	**14.0**
Career		94	94	29.9	.456	.361	.746	5.8	1.7	1.0	.9	12.3

=== EuroLeague ===
Year	Team	GP	GS	MPG	FG%	3P%	FT%	RPG	APG	SPG	BPG	PPG	PIR
2024–25	Partizan	23	13	15.3	.442	.256	.579	2.4	.7	.6	.1	3.9	4.0
Career		23	13	15.3	.442	.256	.579	2.4	.7	.6	.1	3.9	4.0
