= Bogdan Karaičić =

Serbian basketball coach

Balkan Botevgrad
- Position: Head coach
- League: NBL; EuroCup

Personal information
- Born: 31 July 1984 (age 42) Titovo Užice, SR Serbia, SFR Yugoslavia
- Coaching career: 2004–present

Career history

Coaching
- 2009–2010: Hørsholm 79ers (youth)
- 2010–2011: Hørsholm 79ers (assistant)
- 2011–2013: Hørsholm 79ers
- 2013–2016: FOG Næstved
- 2017–2020: Lokomotiv Kuban (assistant)
- 2019: Lokomotiv Kuban (interim)
- 2020: Crvena zvezda (assistant)
- 2021: Mega Basket (assistant)
- 2021–2025: Partizan (assistant)
- 2025–present: Armenia
- 2025: Partizan (interim)
- 2025: Aris Thessaloniki
- 2026–present: Balkan Botevgrad

Career highlights
- As head coach: Serbian League champion (2025); Bulgarian Super Cup winner (2026); As assistant coach: 2× ABA League champion (2023, 2025); Russian Cup winner (2018)

Bogdan Karaičić (Serbian Cyrillic: Богдан Караичић; born 31 July 1984) is a Serbian professional basketball coach. He is currently the head coach of Balkan Botevgrad of the Bulgarian National Basketball League (NBL) and the EuroCup, and for the Armenian national team.

== Coaching career ==
Bogdan Karaičić started his coaching career back in 2004 in Hungary where he worked as a youth coach in several clubs. He was one of the founder of Szentendrei Kosárlabda SE. During his youth coaching Karaičić won several medals in youth competitions. Karaičić joined the Danish club Hørsholm 79ers in 2009 and first served as a coach in their youth system. With U18 team Karaičić won 2nd place in Danish League and in international Scania Cup which is international basketball championship for all youth teams from Nordic countries. In the 2010–11 season, he was assistant coach of the club's men's team in the Danish League. In the 2011–12 season, he was named Hørsholm head coach. In his first season as a head coach Karaičić was leading the Hørsholm 79ers to the Danish Cup final where the team lost to Bakken Bears.

On 9 December 2013, he was named a head coach of Team FOG Næstved of the Danish League. Karaičić won two bronze medals with Team FOG Næstved before he decided to leave the club.

In August 2018, Karaičić was named as an assistant coach for Lokomotiv Kuban of the Russian VTB United League, where season before he worked as a scout. On 15 November 2019, Karaičić was appointed as an interim head coach, leading team in 5 season games.

On 10 June 2020, head coach Saša Obradović added Karaičić to the Crvena zvezda coaching staff as an assistant. Karaičić left the Zvezda following the departure of coach Obradović in December 2020.

In May 2021, Karaičić was named an assistant coach for Mega Soccerbet under Vlada Jovanović. He helped the team to reach Serbian Super League Finals where they lost to Crvena zvezda. Anyhow reaching the Finals was one of the historic result of Mega since it was first time in the club history that they played Serbian League finals.

In August 2021, he was named an assistant coach for Partizan under Željko Obradović. As an interim coach for Partizan in June 2025, caused by a four-game suspension for Obradović in the Serbian League Playoff, Karaičić won his maiden championship trophy as a head coach, after winning over Spartak Subotica in the finals with 2–0.

Karaičić was named head coach of Aris Thessaloniki in July 2025. He was sacked on October 22, 2025.

On July 24, 2026, Karaičić was named head coach of Balkan Botevgrad of the Bulgarian National Basketball League (NBL).

=== National teams ===
Karaičić was an assistant coach of the U20 Denmark team at the 2011 FIBA U20 European Championship Division B in Sarajevo, Bosnia and Herzegovina. He was an assistant coach of the U18 Denmark team at the 2012 FIBA Europe Under-18 Championship in Lithuania and Latvia, which got relegated to the Division B.

Karaičić was the head coach of the U18 Denmark team at the 2013 FIBA Europe Under-18 Championship Division B in Macedonia and 2014 FIBA Europe Under-18 Championship Division B in Bulgaria. He finished his stint as the U18 Denmark head coach with an 8–8 record at two U18 Division B Championships.

In January 2020, coach Igor Kokoškov added Karaičić to the Serbia national team staff as a scout.

== Career achievements ==
As assistant coach

- Russian Cup winner: 1 (with Lokomotiv Kuban: 2018)
- ABA League champion: 2 (with Partizan: 2022–23, 2024–25)

As head coach

- Serbian League champion: 1 (with Partizan: 2024–25)
- Bulgarian Super Cup winner: 1 (with Balkan Botevgrad: 2026)
