= Carlik Jones =

American basketball player (born 1997)

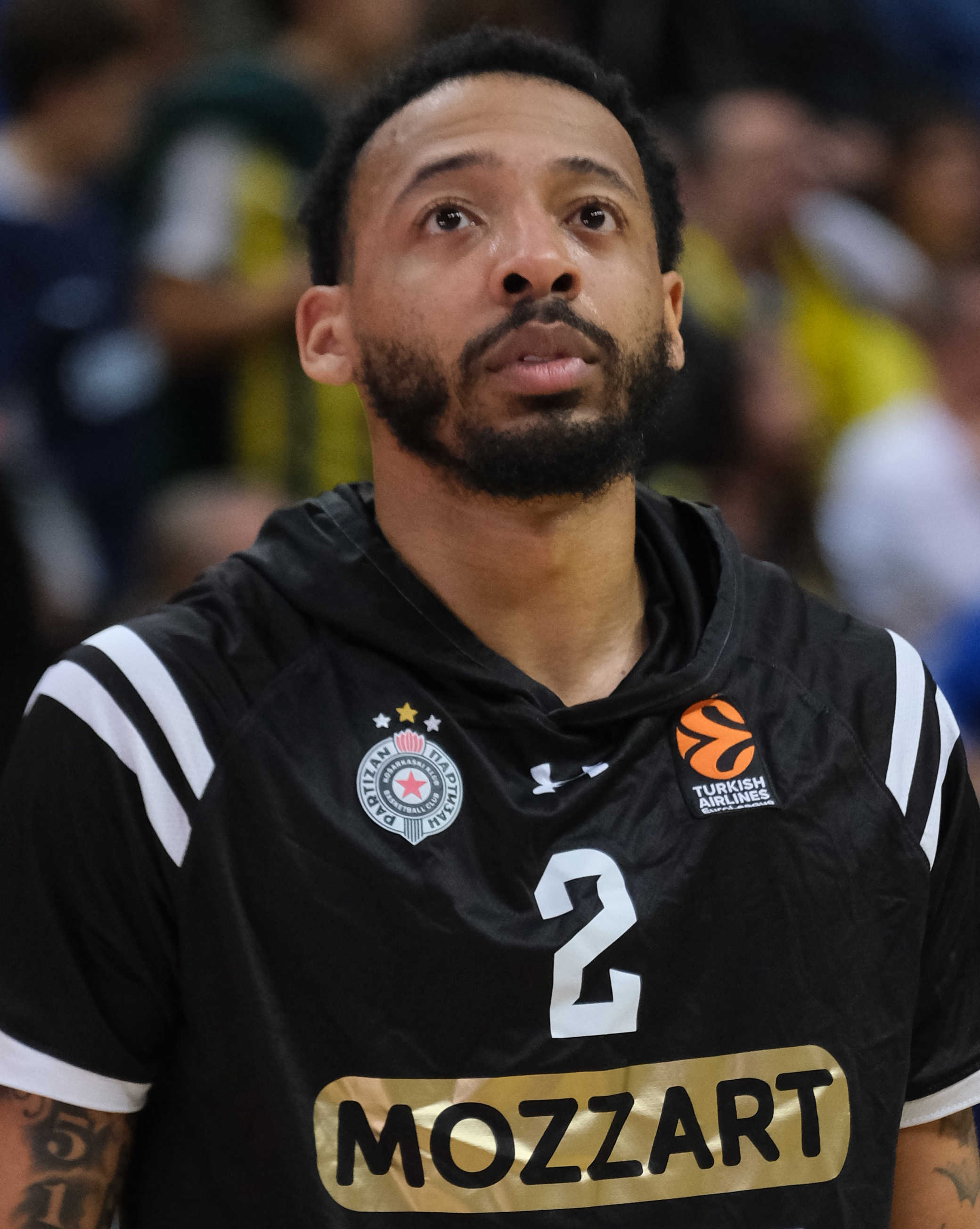
- Jones with Partizan in 2024

No. 1 – Partizan Belgrade
- Position: Point guard
- League: Serbian SuperLeague; ABA League; EuroLeague

Personal information
- Born: December 23, 1997 (age 28) Cincinnati, Ohio, U.S.
- Listed height: 6 ft 1 in (1.85 m)
- Listed weight: 174 lb (79 kg)

Career information
- High school: Aiken (Cincinnati, Ohio)
- College: Radford (2017–2020); Louisville (2020–2021)
- NBA draft: 2021: undrafted
- Playing career: 2021–present

Career history
- 2021–2022: Texas Legends
- 2021: Dallas Mavericks
- 2022: Denver Nuggets
- 2022–2023: Chicago Bulls
- 2022–2023: →Windy City Bulls
- 2023–2024: Zhejiang Golden Bulls
- 2024–present: Partizan

Career highlights
- ABA League champion (2025); NBA G League MVP (2023); NBA G League Top Scorer (2023); All-NBA G League First Team (2023); All-NBA G League Third Team (2022); NBA G League All-Rookie Team (2022); NBA G League Next Up Game (2023); Big South Player of the Year (2020); 2× First-team All-Big South (2019, 2020); First-team All-ACC (2021); Big South Freshman of the Year (2018)
- Stats at NBA.com
- Stats at Basketball Reference

Carlik Anthony Jones Sr. (born December 23, 1997) is an American-born naturalized South Sudanese professional basketball player for Partizan Belgrade of the Serbian SuperLeague, the ABA League, and the EuroLeague. He played college basketball for the Radford Highlanders and the Louisville Cardinals.

Jones plays for the South Sudan national team, who he joined ahead of the 2023 FIBA Basketball World Cup.

== Early life ==
Jones grew up in Cincinnati, Ohio and attended Aiken High School. He competed alongside Jarron Cumberland in AAU play. He was named third team All-Division IV and first-team all-Cincinnati Metro Athletic Conference after 12.5 points, 5.7 rebounds and 5.1 assists per game as a junior. Jones signed with Radford for college basketball on November 12, 2015. As a senior, Jones averaged 22.3 points and six assists and was named The Cincinnati Enquirer Division IV Player of the Year. He scored 57 points in the sectional final against Hughes STEM High School and led the Falcons to a regional championship and to the State final four.

== College career ==
Jones redshirted his true freshman season. He became a starter for the Highlanders as a redshirt freshman and was named the Big South Conference Freshman of the Year and honorable mention All-Big South after averaging 11.8 points, 3.9 rebounds and 3.1 assists per game. He made a three-pointer with two seconds left against Liberty in the Big South Conference Championship game to send Radford to the NCAA Tournament. He was named first team All-Big South after averaging 15.7 points, 5.2 rebounds and 5.8 assists per game in his redshirt sophomore season. Jones was selected as the Big South Conference Men's Basketball Player of the Year and was again named first team All-Big South as a redshirt junior. He averaged 20 points, 5.1 rebounds, and 5.5 assists per game as a junior. Since Jones was set to graduate from Radford at the end of the 2019–20 school year, he had the option to transfer to another school for his final season of athletic eligibility without having to sit out a year, and chose to become a graduate transfer rather than return to Radford.

Widely considered to be one of the best available graduate transfers in the nation, Jones announced that he had chosen the University of Louisville to play his final season of eligibility. He played in 19 games for the Cardinals. On April 10, 2021, he announced that he would test the NBA Draft waters, allowing him to come back for an additional season due to the COVID-19 pandemic. However, he then made another announcement on April 26, saying that he would sign with an agent and not use the additional year of eligibility at Louisville.

== Professional career ==
=== Texas Legends (2021) ===
After going undrafted in the 2021 NBA draft, Jones joined the Dallas Mavericks for the NBA Summer League. On August 21, 2021, he signed with the Mavericks. However, he was waived on October 15. On October 23, he signed with the Texas Legends as an affiliate player. In 10 games, he averaged 20.2 points, 5.4 rebounds and 4.7 assists in 30.8 minutes per game.

=== Dallas Mavericks (2021) ===
On December 23, 2021, Jones signed a 10-day contract with the Mavericks. Jones appeared in 3 games for Dallas, averaging 1 rebound and 1.7 assists in 6.4 minutes per game.

=== Denver Nuggets (2022) ===
On January 1, 2022, upon the completion of his 10-day contract with Dallas, Jones signed another 10-day contract with the Denver Nuggets.

=== Return to the Texas Legends (2022) ===
On January 11, 2022, Jones was reacquired by the Texas Legends.

=== Windy City Bulls (2022) ===
On September 26, 2022, Jones signed with the Chicago Bulls. On October 23, 2022, he joined the training camp roster of their NBA G-League affiliate, the Windy City Bulls.

=== Chicago Bulls (2022–2023) ===
On December 16, 2022, Jones signed a two-way contract with the Chicago Bulls. He was named to the G League's inaugural Next Up Game for the 2022–23 season. On March 3, 2023, Jones' deal was converted to a standard NBA contract by the Bulls and on April 5, he was named NBA G League Most Valuable Player.

On October 20, 2023, Jones was waived by the Bulls, just prior to the start of the 2023–24 season.

=== Zhejiang Golden Bulls (2023–2024) ===
On November 1, 2023, Jones signed with the Zhejiang Golden Bulls of the Chinese Basketball Association.

=== Partizan (2024–present) ===
On August 20, 2024, Jones signed with Partizan of the Serbian SuperLeague, the ABA League, and the EuroLeague. Over 34 EuroLeague games, Jones averaged 14.1 points, 5.4 assists and 3.2 rebounds on 46.1% shooting from the field. During the 2024–25 season, Partizan managed to lift the record eighth ABA League championship, and the Serbian League championship, the first one after 11 seasons.

On October 20, 2025, Jones suffered a serious ankle injury during a game against KK FMP; he was subsequently ruled out for at least three months due to a fracture in his fifth metatarsal bone. Carlik Jones authored a remarkable month of basketball that revived Partizan Bet Belgrade's season and saw him named as the EuroLeague Basketball MVP for the Month of March. The March award covered five games, during which Jones averaged 18.4 points, 4.8 assists and a 20.8 PIR. He shot 60.0% inside the arc and also contributed 3.0 rebounds and 1.2 steals per game.

On April 10, 2026, Jones contract was extended with the team until the end of 2027-2028 season.

== National team career ==
Jones was naturalized to play for the South Sudan national team. He joined the team for the 2023 FIBA Basketball World Cup, where the country made its first FIBA World Cup appearance. He recorded 35 points, 11 rebounds, and six assists in his FIBA World Cup debut against Puerto Rico. On July 20, 2024, Jones recorded a triple double in an exhibition game prior to the 2024 Olympics, when he had 15 points, 11 rebounds, and 11 assists in a 100–101 loss to the United States. He became the first player to record a triple double in a game against the United States.

== Career statistics ==
Legend
GP	Games played	GS	Games started	MPG	Minutes per game
FG%	Field-goal percentage	3P%	3-point field-goal percentage	FT%	Free-throw percentage
RPG	Rebounds per game	APG	Assists per game	SPG	Steals per game
BPG	Blocks per game	PPG	Points per game	PIR	Performance index rating
**Bold**	Career high

=== NBA ===
==== Regular season ====
Year	Team	GP	GS	MPG	FG%	3P%	FT%	RPG	APG	SPG	BPG	PPG
2021–22	Dallas	3	0	6.3	.000	.000	**1.000**	**1.0**	**1.7**	**.3**	.0	.7
2021–22	Denver	2	0	2.0	**.500**	—	—	.0	.0	.0	.0	1.0
2022–23	Chicago	**7**	0	**8.0**	.400	**.500**	.625	.7	.9	**.3**	.0	**2.9**
Career		12	0	6.6	.292	.429	.700	.7	.9	.3	.0	2.0

=== EuroLeague ===
Year	Team	GP	GS	MPG	FG%	3P%	FT%	RPG	APG	SPG	BPG	PPG	PIR
2024–25	Partizan	34	23	26.9	.461	.319	.852	3.2	5.4	1.0	.1	14.1	17.3
2025–26	Partizan	15	13	28.1	.463	.286	.902	3.1	4.6	.8	.3	15.4	16.7
Career		49	36	27.3	.462	.309	.869	3.2	5.1	.9	.2	14.5	17.1

=== Domestic leagues ===
Year	Team	League	GP	MPG	FG%	3P%	FT%	RPG	APG	SPG	BPG	PPG
2021–22	(United States) Texas Legends	G League	43	34.5	.463	.316	.830	4.7	6.7	1.2	.2	20.8
2022–23	(United States) Windy City Bulls	G League	43	37.3	.487	.369	.757	4.8	7.0	1.5	.1	23.5
2023–24	(China) Zhejiang Golden Bulls	CBA	47	21.6	.484	.397	.815	3.9	4.6	1.2	.1	16.7
2024–25	(Serbia) Partizan	ABA	36	22.6	.494	.417	.779	2.2	3.6	.8	.0	12.2

=== College ===
Year	Team	GP	GS	MPG	FG%	3P%	FT%	RPG	APG	SPG	BPG	PPG
2016–17	Radford	Redshirt										
2017–18	Radford	**36**	26	30.4	.413	.305	.767	3.9	3.1	1.1	**.2**	11.8
2018–19	Radford	31	30	34.2	.463	.247	.758	**5.2**	**5.8**	**1.7**	.1	15.7
2019–20	Radford	32	**31**	33.0	**.488**	**.409**	.814	5.1	5.5	1.4	**.2**	**20.0**
2020–21	Louisville	19	19	**37.5**	.402	.321	**.815**	4.9	4.5	1.4	.1	16.8
Career		118	106	33.2	.447	.325	.790	4.7	4.7	1.4	.1	15.9

== See also ==
- List of All-Atlantic Coast Conference men's basketball teams
