= Brandon Davies =

American-Ugandan basketball player (born 1991)

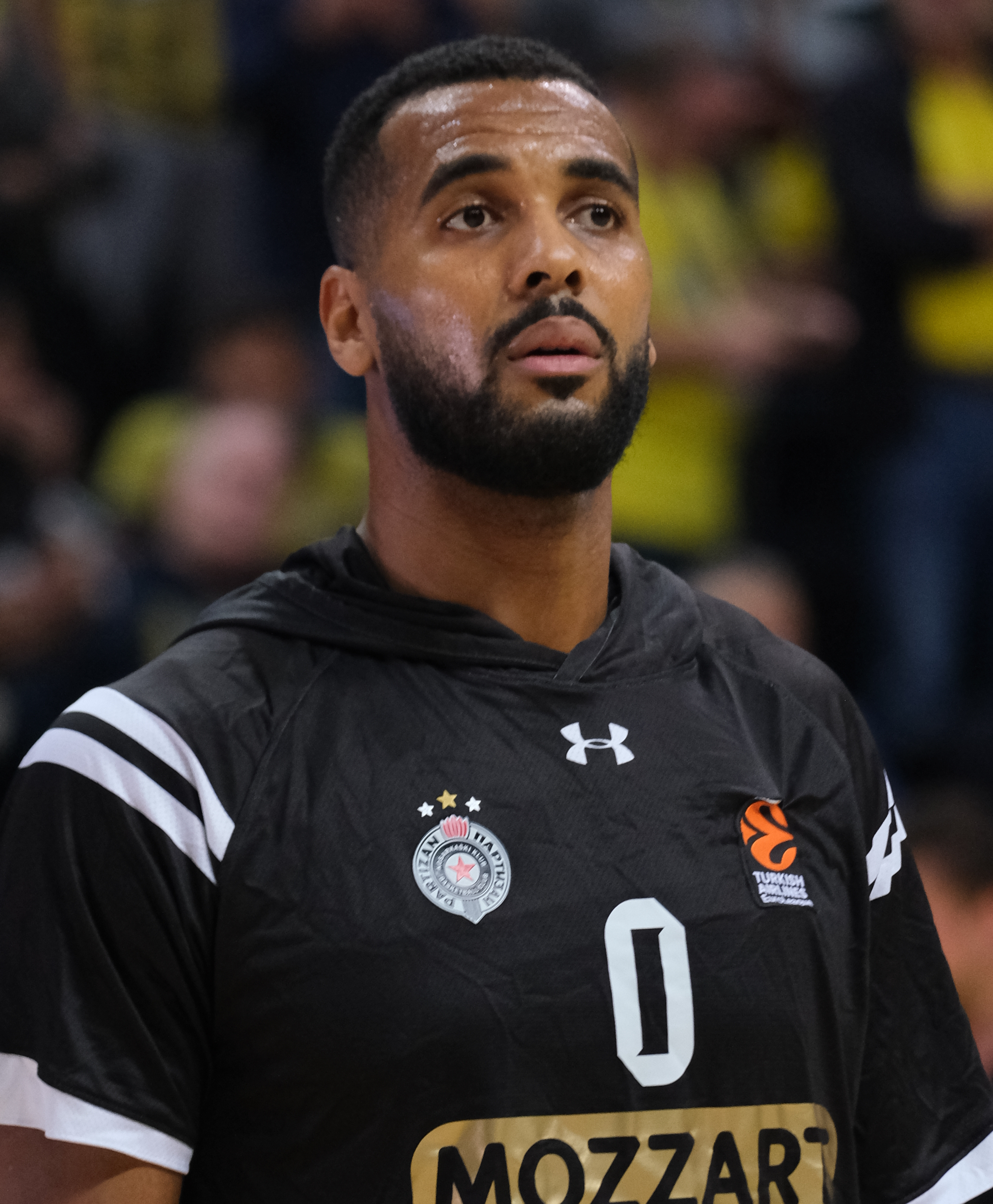
- Davies with Partizan in 2024

Personal information
- Born: July 25, 1991 (age 35) Philadelphia, Pennsylvania, U.S.
- Listed height: 6 ft 10 in (2.08 m)
- Listed weight: 240 lb (109 kg)

Career information
- High school: Provo (Provo, Utah)
- College: BYU (2009–2013)
- NBA draft: 2013: undrafted
- Playing career: 2013–2026
- Position: Center / power forward
- Number: 20, 0, 32

Career history
- 2013–2014: Philadelphia 76ers
- 2014–2015: Brooklyn Nets
- 2015: Élan Chalon
- 2015–2016: Pallacanestro Varese
- 2016–2017: AS Monaco
- 2017–2019: Žalgiris Kaunas
- 2019–2022: FC Barcelona
- 2022–2023: Olimpia Milano
- 2023–2024: Valencia
- 2024–2025: Partizan
- 2025–2026: Alvark Tokyo

Career highlights
- All-EuroLeague First Team (2019); All-EuroLeague Second Team (2021); ABA League champion (2025); Lega Serie A champion (2023); Liga ACB champion (2021); 2× Lithuanian League champion (2018, 2019); 2× Spanish Cup winner (2021, 2022); Lithuanian Cup winner (2018); French League Cup winner (2017); Lithuanian League Finals MVP (2018); 2× All-Lithuanian League Team (2018, 2019); 2× First-team All-WCC (2012, 2013)

Career statistics
- Points: 286 (3.7 ppg)
- Rebounds: 192 (2.5 rpg)
- Assists: 58 (0.7 apg)
- Stats at NBA.com
- Stats at Basketball Reference

Brandon Davies (born July 25, 1991) is an American-born naturalized Ugandan former professional basketball player. He represented the senior Ugandan national team. He was an all-conference college player at Brigham Young University. Davies is a two time All-EuroLeague selection.

== Early life and college career ==
Davies was born in Philadelphia, Pennsylvania but adopted by single mother Kathy Davies and raised in Provo, Utah. He attended Provo High School, where his team won state titles in his sophomore and junior seasons. After considering schools such as California, Gonzaga, and Utah, Davies chose to play college basketball at Brigham Young.

After playing a reserve role as a freshman in 2009–10, Davies became a key player for the Cougars as a sophomore. He served as the key inside player for the small, sharp-shooting 2010–11 Cougars (led by eventual National Player of the Year Jimmer Fredette). BYU raced to a 27–2 record and was ranked no. 3 in the AP Poll when Davies was suspended from the team for violating BYU's honor code by having premarital sex with his girlfriend.

Davies was reinstated to the team as a junior and was named to the All-West Coast Conference team in each of his last two seasons at BYU. As a senior, Davies served as team captain and averaged 17.7 points and 8.0 rebounds per game.

== Professional career ==
Following his graduation from BYU, Davies was invited to participate in the Portsmouth Invitational Tournament (PIT) pre-NBA draft camp. Davies performed well, averaging 20.7 points per game on 68% shooting and grabbing 9.3 rebounds per game. He was named MVP of the PIT. Davies' performance earned him an invitation to the Chicago NBA draft combine. After going undrafted in the 2013 NBA draft, he joined the Los Angeles Clippers for the 2013 NBA Summer League. On September 5, 2013, he signed with the Clippers, but was later waived on October 21.

=== Philadelphia 76ers (2013–2014) ===
On October 28, 2013, Davies signed with the Philadelphia 76ers. He played in his first NBA game on November 2, 2013, against the Chicago Bulls, scoring two points in two minutes of action. On January 18, 2014, he fractured his right small finger, requiring surgery and up to a month of rehabilitation.

On November 5, 2014, Davies scored a career-high 20 points in an 89–91 loss to the Orlando Magic.

=== Brooklyn Nets (2014–2015) ===
On December 11, 2014, Davies was traded to the Brooklyn Nets in exchange for Andrei Kirilenko, Jorge Gutiérrez, the Nets' second-round draft pick in 2020, the right to swap second-round picks in 2018, and cash considerations. On January 6, 2015, he was waived by the Nets after appearing in seven games.

=== Élan Chalon (2015) ===
On January 12, 2015, Davies signed with Élan Chalon of the LNB Pro League in Chalon-sur-Saône, France for the rest of the 2014–15 LNB Pro A season as a replacement for an injured player. He helped Élan reach the league playoffs.

=== Pallacanestro Varese (2015–2016) ===
In August 2015, Davies signed with Pallacanestro Varese in Varese, Italy for the 2015–16 season.

=== AS Monaco (2016–2017) ===
In July 2016, Davies signed with AS Monaco of the French LNB Pro A and the Basketball Champions League.

=== Žalgiris Kaunas (2017–2019) ===
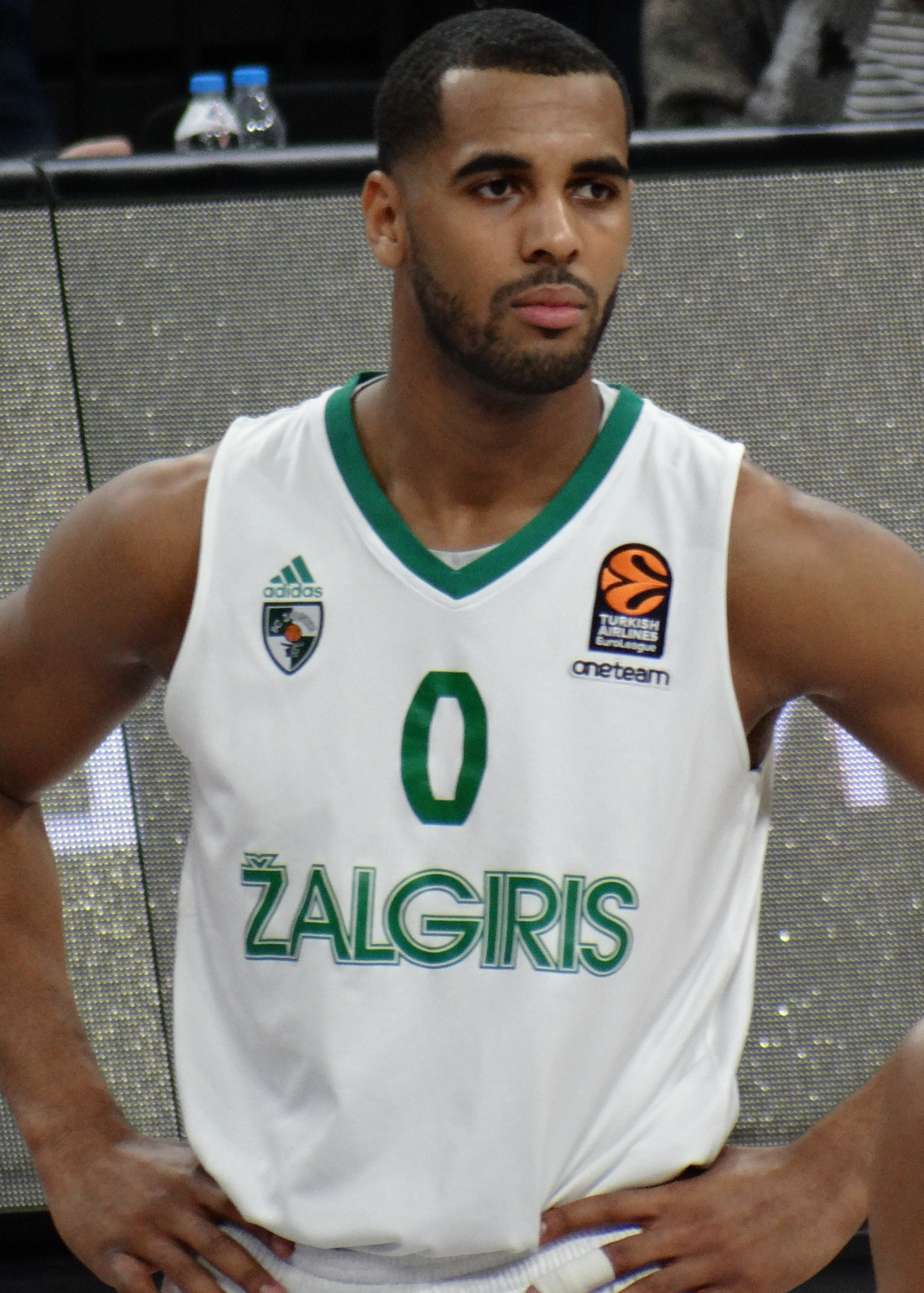
Davies with Žalgiris Kaunas in 2018

In the summer of 2017, Davies played in The Basketball Tournament on ESPN for Team Fredette. He competed for the $2 million prize, and for Team Fredette, he scored 20 points and grabbed seven rebounds in their first-round game, which they lost to Team Utah (Utah Alumni) 100–97.

On June 23, 2017, Davies signed with a 1+1 contract with Lithuanian team Žalgiris Kaunas of the Lithuanian Basketball League. Over his two seasons with Žalgiris, Davies helped the team achieve much success, in particular in the EuroLeague. On May 9, 2019, Davies was named to the All-EuroLeague First Team, becoming the first Žalgiris player to win the award in 15 years since Arvydas Sabonis in 2004.

=== FC Barcelona (2019–2022) ===
On July 4, 2019, Davies signed a two-year deal with the Spanish club Barcelona. In his second game with Barcelona, Davies recorded 24 points and 11 rebounds in a 95–87 win over Saski Baskonia.

=== Olimpia Milano (2022–2023) ===
On June 24, 2022, Davies signed a two-year contract with Italian champions Olimpia Milano of the Lega Basket Serie A, playing also the EuroLeague. On July 5, 2023, Davies mutually parted ways with the Italian powerhouse.

=== Valencia (2023–2024) ===
On July 5, 2023, Davies signed a two-year deal with Spanish club Valencia. On July 4, 2024, he parted ways with the club.

=== Partizan Belgrade (2024–2025) ===
On August 20, 2024, Davies signed with Partizan Mozzart Bet of the ABA League, Basketball League of Serbia (KLS) and the EuroLeague. In his debut season with Partizan, Davies averaged 9.9 points and 3.6 rebounds over 33 EuroLeague games, while shooting career-high 49.2% from the three-point line. During the season, Partizan managed to lift the record eighth ABA League championship, and the Serbian League championship, the first one after 11 seasons.

=== Alvark Tokyo (2025–2026) ===
On June 27, 2025, Davies signed with Alvark Tokyo of the B.League. His campaign was cut short by injuries, limiting him to 25 games during the 2025–26 season where averaged 13.4 points and 4.8 rebounds.

On July 23, 2026, Davies announced his retirement from professional basketball.

== National team career ==
Coinciding with his move to Barcelona, Davies acquired a Ugandan passport, because under the Cotonou Agreement African players are not subject to the same limited quotas in the Liga ACB as American players. As part of the arrangement, Barcelona agreed to release Davies to play some matches for the Uganda national team, and in November 2021 he played in three 2023 World Cup qualifiers in Benguela. (The Turkey team complained that Barcelona had not released Sertaç Şanlı for its qualifiers in Europe.)

== Career statistics ==
Legend
GP	Games played	GS	Games started	MPG	Minutes per game
FG%	Field-goal percentage	3P%	3-point field-goal percentage	FT%	Free-throw percentage
RPG	Rebounds per game	APG	Assists per game	SPG	Steals per game
BPG	Blocks per game	PPG	Points per game	PIR	Performance index rating
**Bold**	Career high

=== EuroLeague ===
*	Led the league

Year	Team	GP	GS	MPG	FG%	3P%	FT%	RPG	APG	SPG	BPG	PPG	PIR
2017–18	Žalgiris	**36***	**33**	17.4	**.577**	—	**.848**	3.5	.9	.9	.4	9.3	9.8
2018–19	Žalgiris	34	**33**	**24.2**	.559	—	.762	**5.5**	**2.0**	1.0	.4	**14.2**	**16.9**
2019–20	Barcelona	28*	14	20.1	.515	.385	.786	3.9	1.6	**1.1**	**.6**	9.6	10.3
2020–21	Barcelona	35	10	21.3	.558	.429	.754	4.5	1.5	.7	.4	12.0	13.9
2021–22	Barcelona	**36**	9	19.9	.519	.250	.680	3.7	1.6	.6	.3	9.9	10.3
2022–23	Milano	33	13	18.3	.532	.350	.703	3.2	1.9	.6	.3	10.2	11.5
2023–24	Valencia	28	18	22.4	.496	.306	.802	3.8	**2.0**	.8	**.6**	12.1	12.2
2024–25	Partizan	33	17	18.7	.508	**.492**	.595	3.6	1.5	.9	.4	9.9	10.8
Career		263	147	20.3	.533	.384	.745	4.0	1.6	.8	.4	10.9	12.0

=== NBA ===
==== Regular season ====
Year	Team	GP	GS	MPG	FG%	3P%	FT%	RPG	APG	SPG	BPG	PPG
2013–14	Philadelphia	**51**	0	11.3	**.422**	.200	.642	2.1	.6	.5	.2	2.8
2014–15	Philadelphia	20	**6**	**18.9**	.412	.233	.636	**3.7**	**1.4**	**.9**	.2	**6.3**
2014–15	Brooklyn	7	0	6.3	.333	**.250**	**.750**	1.4	.3	.1	**.4**	2.3
Career		78	8	12.8	.411	.227	.644	2.5	.7	.5	.2	3.7

=== Domestic leagues ===
Season	Team	League	GP	GS	MPG	FG%	3P%	FT%	RPG	APG	SPG	BPG	PPG
2014–15	(France) Élan Chalon	Pro A	16	12	20.2	.421	.240	.690	4.1	1.3	.9	.4	8.0
2015–16	(Italy) Varese	LBA	30	26	**25.7**	.473	.158	.740	**6.5**	1.5	1.0	**.9**	13.3
2016–17	Monaco	Pro A	30	10	21.2	.492	.243	.646	5.1	1.7	.9	.7	10.4
2017–18	(Lithuania) Žalgiris	LKL	**45**	**38**	17.2	.616	.000	.762	5.2	1.6	.9	.6	11.3
2018–19	(Lithuania) Žalgiris	LKL	39	34	18.3	**.634**	.000	.738	4.2	1.8	.9	.5	12.1
2019–20	(Spain) Barcelona	ACB	28	13	18.6	.543	**.435**	.760	4.6	1.0	.9	.4	11.3
2020–21	(Spain) Barcelona	ACB	35	15	17.6	.571	.417	**.798**	3.7	1.4	.7	.3	10.2
2021–22	(Spain) Barcelona	ACB	38	9	18.6	.527	.167	.708	3.8	1.7	.8	.4	9.7
2022–23	(Italy) Olimpia	LBA	24	16	19.9	.599	.167	.734	4.8	1.6	1.0	.6	13.5
2023–24	(Spain) Valencia	ACB	29	22	22.8	.528	.429	.728	4.8	**2.5**	1.1	**.9**	**15.2**
2024–25	(Serbia) Partizan	ABA	34	21	15.8	.442	.160	.789	2.9	1.4	.6	.4	7.6
2025–26	(Japan) Alvark Tokyo	B.League	25	16	22.2	.579	.293	.629	4.8	1.9	**1.3**	**.9**	13.4
Career			373	232	19.5	.540	.270	.739	4.5	1.6	.9	.6	11.3

== Personal life ==
Davies is a member of the Church of Jesus Christ of Latter-day Saints. He had a son with Jayci Underwood in 2011, that has been adopted since birth. He married Lenzie Quist of Riverside, California, in January 2015. They have a daughter, born in the summer of 2016.
