= C. J. Bryce =

American basketball player

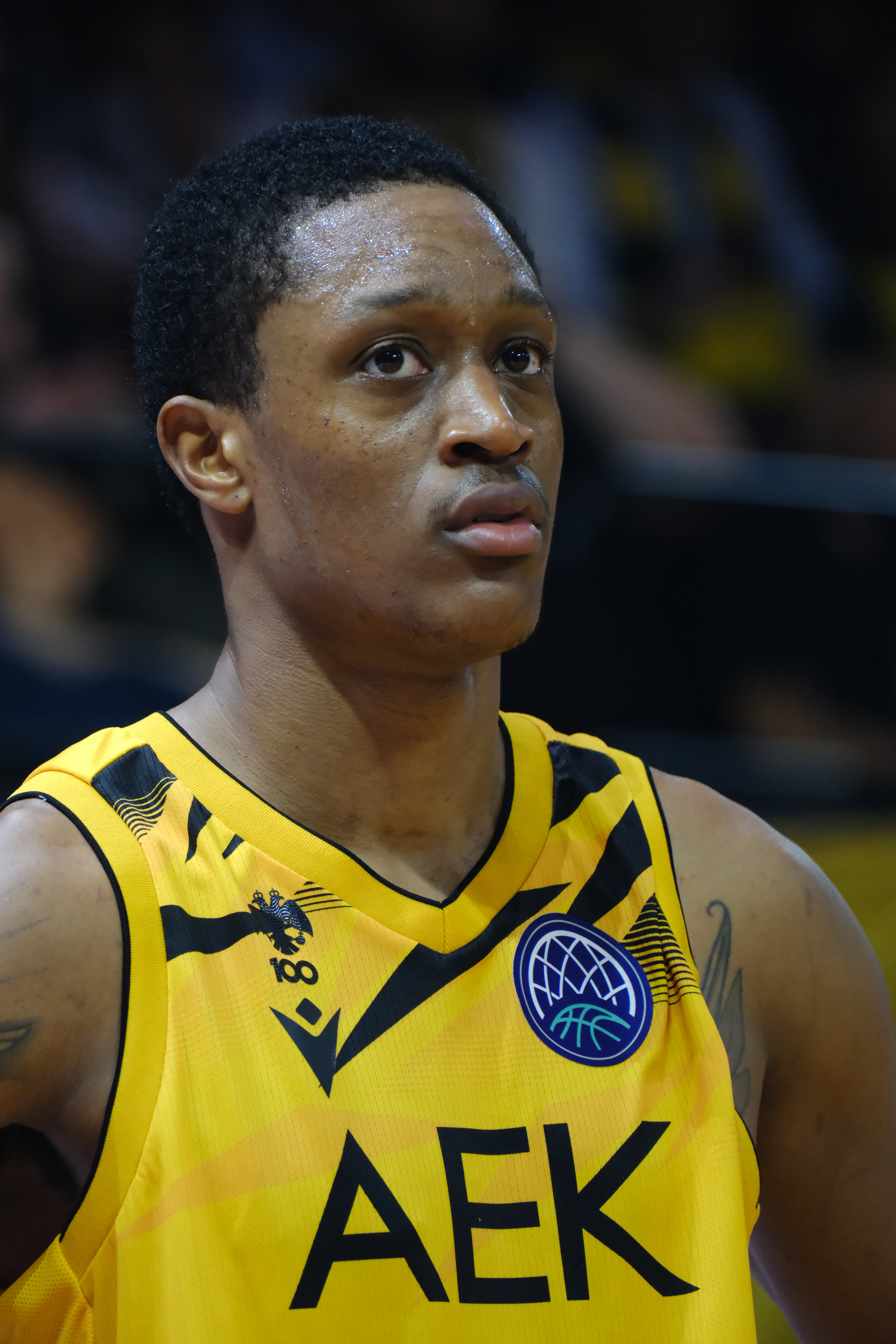
- CJ Bryce with AEK Athens

No. 9 – UNICS Kazan
- Position: Shooting guard / small forward
- League: VTB United League

Personal information
- Born: October 30, 1996 (age 30) Charlotte, North Carolina, U.S.
- Listed height: 6 ft 5 in (1.96 m)
- Listed weight: 210 lb (95 kg)

Career information
- High school: North Mecklenburg (Huntersville, North Carolina)
- College: UNC Wilmington (2015–2017); NC State (2018–2020)
- NBA draft: 2021: undrafted
- Playing career: 2021–present

Career history
- 2021–2022: Hübner Nyíregyháza
- 2022–2023: Würzburg
- 2023–2024: Parma
- 2024–2025: AEK Athens
- 2025–present: UNICS Kazan

Career highlights
- First-team All-CAA (2017); CAA tournament MVP (2017)

Clarence Leland Bryce (born October 30, 1996) is an American professional basketball player for UNICS Kazan of the VTB United League. He played college basketball for the UNC Wilmington Seahawks and the NC State Wolfpack.

== High school career ==
Bryce attended North Mecklenburg High School in Huntersville, North Carolina. As a senior, he averaged 24 points and 7 rebounds per game. During this season, he was the Team captain and named the MVP.

== College career ==
Bryce committed to UNC Wilmington. During his two seasons with the Seahawks, he was the leader of the team. In his final season with the team, he received All-Colonial Athletic Association first-team honours and was named the MVP of the CAA tournament in 2017.

In 2018, he was transferred to NC State. He stayed with the Wolfpack for two seasons. In his final season, he averaged 13.3 points, 6.2 rebounds and 2.1 assists per game.

== Professional career ==
Bryce started his professional career with Hübner Nyíregyháza BS in Hungary. After a successful season with the club, he joined Würzburg Baskets of the Basketball Bundesliga.

On 2023, he joined Parma Basket of the VTB League.

On September 5, 2024, he joined AEK of the Greek Basket League and the Basketball Champions League (BCL).

On July 29, 2025, Bryce joined BC UNICS of the VTB United League.
