= 2024–25 Basketball League of Serbia =

Basketball League of Serbia season

- League: Basketball League of Serbia
- Season: 2024–25
- Dates: 4 October 2024 – 19 April 2025 (First League); 8 May – 24 June 2025 (SuperLeague)
- Games played: 30 each (First League)
- Teams: 16 (First League); 22 (total)
- TV partner: Arena Sport

First League
- Top seed: Vršac Meridianbet
- Season MVP: (Serbia) Nemanja Popović
- Promoted: Hercegovac Gajdobra; Borac Zemun
- Relegated: Mladost SP; Novi Pazar Salamander

Playoffs
- Champions: Partizan Mozzart Bet (9th title)
- Runners-up: Spartak Office Shoes
- Semifinalists: Crvena zvezda Meridianbet; FMP Soccerbet
- Finals MVP: (Germany) Duane Washington Jr.

Seasons
- ← 2023–24 2025–26 →

The 2024–25 Admiral Bet Basketball League of Serbia (Serbian Cyrillic: Кошаркашка лига Србије 2024–25.) is the 19th season of the Basketball League of Serbia, the top-tier professional basketball league in Serbia. Also, it is the 80th national championship played by Serbian clubs inclusive of the nation's previous incarnations as Yugoslavia and Serbia & Montenegro.

Crvena zvezda Meridianbet is the 9-time defending champion.

Partizan Mozzart Bet did not register several of its best players for this competition.

== Teams ==
A total of 22 teams participate in the 2024–25 Basketball League of Serbia.

=== Distribution ===
The following is the access list for this season.

Access list for the 2024–25 Serbian League
| | Teams entering in this round | Teams advancing from the previous round |
|---|---|---|
| First League (16 teams) | 12 highest-placed teams from the last season not participating in the ABA League First Division; 2 highest-placed teams from the Second League | |
| Super League playoffs (8 teams) | 2 best-placed teams from the First League; 6 teams participated in 2024-25 ABA League First Division | |

=== Promotion and relegation ===
Teams promoted from the Second League

- BKK Radnički
- Mladost SP

Teams relegated to the Second League

- KK Zdravlje

=== Venues and locations ===
Location of clubs in the 2024–25 season

| Club | Home city | Arena | Capacity |
|---|---|---|---|
| BKK Radnički | Belgrade | SC Šumice | 1,000 |
| Borac Mozzart | Čačak | Borac Hall | 3,000 |
| Crvena zvezda Meridianbet | Belgrade | Belgrade Arena | 5,878 |
| Čačak 94 Quantox | Čačak | Borac Hall | 3,000 |
| Dynamic Balkan Bet | Belgrade | Ranko Žeravica Hall | 5,000 |
| FMP Soccerbet | Belgrade | Železnik Hall | 3,000 |
| Joker | Sombor | Mostonga Hall | 1,000 |
| Mega MIS | Belgrade | Mega Factory Hall | 700 |
| Metalac | Valjevo | Valjevo Sports Hall | 1,500 |
| Mladost MaxBet | Zemun | Master Sport Center | 750 |
| Mladost SP | Smederevska Palanka | Vuk Karadžić School Hall | 500 |
| Novi Pazar | Novi Pazar | Pendik Sports Hall | 1,600 |
| OKK Beograd | Belgrade | Mega Factory Hall | 700 |
| Partizan Mozzart Bet | Belgrade | Belgrade Arena | 18,386 |
| Sloboda | Užice | Veliki Park Hall | 2,200 |
| Sloga | Kraljevo | Kraljevo Sports Hall | 3,350 |
| Spartak Office Shoes | Subotica | Dudova Šuma Sports Center | 3,000 |
| SPD Radnički | Kragujevac | Jezero Hall | 3,750 |
| Tamiš | Pančevo | Strelište Sports Hall | 1,100 |
| Vojvodina mts | Novi Sad | SPC Vojvodina | 7,022 |
| Vršac Meridianbet | Vršac | Millennium Center | 4,400 |
| Zlatibor Gold Gondola | Čajetina | Čajetina Sport Center | 1,000 |

| Clubs in the 2024–25 First ABA League |
| Clubs in the 2024–25 Second ABA League |

== First League ==
=== Standings ===
| Pos | Team | Pld | W | L | PF | PA | PD | Pts | Qualification or relegation |
|---|---|---|---|---|---|---|---|---|---|
| 1 | Vršac Meridianbet | 30 | 25 | 5 | 2628 | 2397 | +231 | 55 | Qualification to SuperLeague and ABA 2 |
| 2 | Zlatibor Mozzart | 30 | 21 | 9 | 2647 | 2404 | +243 | 51 | Qualification to SuperLeague and ABA 2 |
| 3 | Vojvodina mts | 30 | 21 | 9 | 2544 | 2247 | +297 | 51 | Received a wildcard for ABA 2 |
| 4 | Sloboda | 30 | 21 | 9 | 2536 | 2345 | +191 | 51 | |
| 5 | Mladost MaxBet | 30 | 20 | 10 | 2594 | 2467 | +127 | 50 | |
| 6 | Joker | 30 | 19 | 11 | 2728 | 2579 | +149 | 49 | |
| 7 | OKK Beograd | 30 | 18 | 12 | 2659 | 2587 | +72 | 48 | |
| 8 | SPD Radnički | 30 | 16 | 14 | 2455 | 2469 | −14 | 46 | Received a wildcard for ABA 2 |
| 9 | Dynamic Balkan Bet | 30 | 14 | 16 | 2589 | 2569 | +20 | 44 | |
| 10 | BKK Radnički | 30 | 13 | 17 | 2504 | 2487 | +17 | 43 | |
| 11 | Sloga | 30 | 12 | 18 | 2419 | 2585 | −166 | 42 | |
| 12 | Tamiš | 30 | 11 | 19 | 2419 | 2561 | −142 | 41 | |
| 13 | Čačak 94 Quantox | 30 | 10 | 20 | 2411 | 2455 | −44 | 40 | |
| 14 | Metalac | 30 | 9 | 21 | 2343 | 2473 | −130 | 39 | |
| 15 | Mladost SP | 30 | 9 | 21 | 2365 | 2570 | −205 | 39 | Relegation to Second League |
| 16 | Novi Pazar Salamander | 30 | 1 | 29 | 2230 | 2876 | −646 | 31 | Relegation to Second League |

Updated to match(es) played on 23 April 2025. Source: KLS, SrbijaSport

== SuperLeague ==
=== Qualified teams ===
| First ABA League | BLS First League |
|---|---|
| 1 Partizan Mozzart Bet; 2 Crvena zvezda Meridianbet; 3 Spartak Office Shoes; 4 Mega Superbet; 5 FMP Soccerbet; 6 Borac Mozzart | 1 Vršac Meridianbet; 2 Zlatibor Mozzart |

==== Personnel and sponsorship ====
| Team | Head coach | Captain | Kit manufacturer | Shirt sponsor |
|---|---|---|---|---|
| Borac Mozzart | (Serbia) Saša Ocokoljić | (Serbia) Uroš Čarapić | — | P.S. Fashion / Mozzart |
| Crvena zvezda Meridianbet | (Greece) Ioannis Sfairopoulos | (Serbia) Branko Lazić | Adidas | Meridian / mts |
| FMP Soccerbet | (Serbia) Saša Nikitović | (Serbia) Ognjen Kuzmić | Adidas | Soccerbet |
| Mega Superbet | (Serbia) Marko Barać | | Adidas | Superbet |
| Partizan Mozzart Bet | (Serbia) Željko Obradović | (Serbia) Vanja Marinković | Under Armour | Mozzart / NIS |
| Spartak Office Shoes | (Serbia) Vlada Jovanović | (Serbia) Miloš Milisavljević | Sketchers | Office Shoes / Polovni automobili |
| Vršac Meridianbet | (Serbia) Lazar Spasić | (Serbia) Bratislav Jeković | Ardu Sport | Meridian / Villager |
| Zlatibor Mozzart | (Serbia) Strajin Nedović | (Serbia) Brano Đukanović | Ardu Sport | Mozzart |

=== Standings ===
| Pos | Team | Pld | W | L | PF | PA | PD | Pts | Qualification or relegation | PAR | CZV | SPA | MEG | FMP | BOR |
|---|---|---|---|---|---|---|---|---|---|---|---|---|---|---|---|
| 1 | Partizan Mozzart Bet | 10 | 9 | 1 | 916 | 753 | +163 | 19 | Advance to semifinals | — | 85–77 | 103–80 | 89–82 | 90–65 | 96–66 |
| 2 | Crvena zvezda Meridianbet | 10 | 8 | 2 | 892 | 780 | +112 | 18 | Advance to semifinals | 89–84 | — | 77–78 | 81–72 | 97–63 | 105–85 |
| 3 | Spartak Office Shoes | 10 | 5 | 5 | 868 | 867 | +1 | 15 | Advance to quarterfinals | 80–89 | 87–94 | — | 110–86 | 93–86 | 89–80 |
| 4 | Mega Superbet | 10 | 4 | 6 | 851 | 870 | −19 | 14 | Advance to quarterfinals | 90–100 | 76–81 | 97–90 | — | 83–80 | 98–74 |
| 5 | FMP Soccerbet | 10 | 3 | 7 | 775 | 881 | −106 | 13 | Advance to preliminary round | 64–91 | 93–94 | 89–88 | 89–87 | — | 74–67 |
| 6 | Borac Mozzart | 10 | 1 | 9 | 722 | 873 | −151 | 11 | Advance to preliminary round | 64–91 | 72–98 | 66–73 | 76–80 | 92–72 | — |

Updated to match(es) played on 23 April 2025. Source: KLS

=== Preliminary round ===
| Team 1 | Agg. | Team 2 | 1st leg | 2nd leg |
|---|---|---|---|---|
| FMP Soccerbet | 207–151 | Zlatibor Mozzart | 108–69 | 99–82 |
| Vršac Meridianbet | 162–143 | Borac Mozzart | 69–91 | 93–52 |

== Playoffs ==
=== Bracket ===
Quarterfinals
Mega Superbet | 0
FMP Soccerbet | 2
Spartak Office Shoes | 2
Vršac Meridianbet | 0

Semifinals
Partizan Mozzart Bet | 2
FMP Soccerbet | 1
Crvena zvezda Merdianbet | 0
Spartak Office Shoes | 2

Finals
Partizan Mozzart Bet | 2
Spartak Office Shoes | 0

=== Quarterfinals ===
| Team 1 | Series | Team 2 | Game 1 | Game 2 | Game 3 |
|---|---|---|---|---|---|
| Mega Superbet | 0–2 | FMP Soccerbet | 81–86 | 73–77 | — |
| Spartak Office Shoes | 2–0 | Vršac Meridianbet | 94–76 | 84–83 | — |

=== Semifinals ===
| Team 1 | Series | Team 2 | Game 1 | Game 2 | Game 3 |
|---|---|---|---|---|---|
| Partizan Mozzart Bet | 2–1 | FMP Soccerbet | 84–74 | 69–78 | 90–80 |
| Crvena zvezda Meridianbet | 0–2 | Spartak Office Shoes | 81–93 | 77–93 | — |

=== Finals ===
| Team 1 | Series | Team 2 | Game 1 | Game 2 | Game 3 |
|---|---|---|---|---|---|
| Partizan Mozzart Bet | 2–0 | Spartak Office Shoes | 94–74 | 93–79 | — |

== Clubs in European competitions ==
| Competition | Team | Progress | Result |
|---|---|---|---|
| EuroLeague | Crvena zvezda Meridianbet | Play-in | Eliminated by (German Basketball Federation) Bayern Munich |
| EuroLeague | Partizan Mozzart Bet | Regular season | 12th (16–18) |
| Champions League | FMP Soccerbet | Regular season Group H | 4th (1–5) |
| Champions League | Spartak Office Shoes | Qualification rounds – Quarter-finals | Eliminated by (Lithuanian Basketball Federation) BC Juventus |

== See also ==
- List of current Basketball League of Serbia team rosters
- 2024–25 Second Men's League of Serbia (basketball)
- 2024–25 Radivoj Korać Cup
- 2024–25 Basketball Cup of Serbia
- 2024–25 ABA League First Division
- 2024–25 ABA League Second Division
- 2024–25 First Women's Basketball League of Serbia
- 2024–25 KK Crvena zvezda season
- 2024–25 KK Partizan season
