= 2025 EuroLeague Playoffs =

European basketball postseason play

The 2025 EuroLeague Playoffs, known as the 2025 Turkish Airlines EuroLeague Playoffs for sponsorship purposes, was the second postseason portion of the 2024–25 EuroLeague basketball competition. They began on 15 April 2024, with the Play-in games, and ended on 6 May 2025. The top six finishers in the regular season qualified for the playoffs directly, while the teams placed from seventh to tenth battled for the remaining two seeds in a play-in tournament. The playoffs consisted of four series of two teams each, played in a best-of-five format. The winners of each of the playoffs series advanced to the Final Four, which determined the EuroLeague champion for the 2024–25 season.

== Qualified teams ==
Pos	Team	Pld	W	L	PF	PA	PD	Qualification
1	(Hellenic Basketball Federation) Olympiacos	34	24	10	2941	2770	+171	Qualification to playoffs
2	(Turkish Basketball Federation) Fenerbahçe Beko	34	23	11	2829	2760	+69	Qualification to playoffs
3	(Hellenic Basketball Federation) Panathinaikos AKTOR	34	22	12	2990	2843	+147	Qualification to playoffs
4	(French Federation of Basketball) Monaco	34	21	13	2913	2801	+112	Qualification to playoffs
5	(Spanish Basketball Federation) Barcelona	34	20	14	2966	2837	+129	Qualification to playoffs
6	(Turkish Basketball Federation) Anadolu Efes	34	20	14	2941	2788	+153	Qualification to playoffs
7	(Spanish Basketball Federation) Real Madrid	34	20	14	2870	2797	+73	Qualification to play-in
8	(French Federation of Basketball) Paris Basketball	34	19	15	2940	2910	+30	Qualification to play-in
9	(German Basketball Federation) Bayern Munich	34	19	15	2965	2984	−19	Qualification to play-in
10	(Basketball Federation of Serbia) Crvena zvezda Meridianbet	34	18	16	2776	2714	+62	Qualification to play-in

Source: EuroLeague
Rules for classification: Regular season tiebreakers

=== Tiebreakers ===
When more than two teams are tied, the ranking will be established taking into account the victories obtained in the games played only among them. Should the tie persist among some, but not all, of the teams, the ranking of the teams still tied will be determined by again taking into account the victories in the games played only among them, and repeating this same procedure until the tie is entirely resolved. If a tie persists, the ranking will be determined by the goal difference in favour and against in the games played only among the teams still tied.

== Play-in ==
Under the new format, the 7th to 10th-ranked teams faced each other in the play-in. Each game is hosted by the team with the higher regular season record. The format was similar to the first two rounds of the Page–McIntyre system for a four-team playoff that was identical to that of the NBA play-in tournament. First, the 7th seed will host the 8th seed, with the winner advancing to the playoffs as the 7th seed; likewise the 9th seed will host the 10th seed, with the loser eliminated. Then the loser of the 7-v-8 game will host the winner of the 9-v-10 game, with the winner of that game getting the final playoff spot, as the 8th seed.

Round 1
Play-In A
7	(Spanish Basketball Federation) Real Madrid	73
8	(French Federation of Basketball) Paris Basketball	81
Play-In B
9	(German Basketball Federation) Bayern Munich	97
10	(Basketball Federation of Serbia) Crvena zvezda Meridianbet	93

Round 2
Play-In C
7	(Spanish Basketball Federation) Real Madrid	93
9	(German Basketball Federation) Bayern Munich	71

=== Matches ===
15 April 2025 Play-in A	Real Madrid (Spanish Basketball Federation)	73–81	(French Federation of Basketball) Paris Basketball	Madrid
21:00 CEST	Scoring by quarter: 22–27, 14–19, 22–16, 15–19
	Pts: Campazzo 17; Rebs: Deck 8 Asts: Campazzo 5 PIR: Campazzo 23	Boxscore	Pts: Shorts 23; Rebs: Ward, Jantunen 7 Asts: Shorts 9 PIR: Shorts 27	Arena: Movistar Arena; Attendance: 11,086; Referees: Ilija Belošević, Robert Lottermoser, Borys Ryzhyk

15 April 2025 Play-in B	Bayern Munich (German Basketball Federation)	97–93(OT)	(Basketball Federation of Serbia) Crvena zvezda Meridianbet	Munich
20:30 CEST	Scoring by quarter: 21–23, 18–23, 32–15, 13–23, Overtime: 13–9
	Pts: Booker 21; Rebs: Lučić 8 Asts: Weiler-Babb 6 PIR: Booker 25	Boxscore	Pts: Petrušev 30; Rebs: Miller-McIntyre, Kalinić 7 Asts: Miller-McIntyre 8 PIR: Petrušev 32	Arena: SAP Garden; Attendance: 11,200; Referees: Miguel Ángel Pérez, Emin Moğulkoç, Artūras Šukys

18 April 2025 Play-in C	Real Madrid (Spanish Basketball Federation)	93–71	(German Basketball Federation) Bayern Munich	Madrid
20:45 CEST	Scoring by quarter: 33–17, 19–16, 21–22, 20–16
	Pts: Hezonja 19; Rebs: Hezonja 7 Asts: Campazzo 5 PIR: Hezonja 24	Boxscore	Pts: Napier 19; Rebs: Napier, Voigtmann 4 Asts: Weiler-Babb, Voigtmann 4 PIR: Napier 22	Arena: Movistar Arena; Attendance: 9,273; Referees: Damir Javor, Mehdi Difallah, Gytis Vilius

== Playoff series ==
Playoff series are best-of-five. The first team to win three games wins the series. A 2–2–1 format is used – teams with home-court advantage played games 1, 2, and 5 at home, while their opponents will host games 3 and 4. Games 4 and 5 will only be played if necessary. The four winning teams advance to the Final Four.

Team 1	Series	Team 2	Game 1	Game 2	Game 3	Game 4	Game 5
Olympiacos (Hellenic Basketball Federation)	3–1	(Spanish Basketball Federation) Real Madrid	84–72	77–71	72–80	86–84	—
Fenerbahçe Beko (Turkish Basketball Federation)	3–0	(French Federation of Basketball) Paris Basketball	83–78	89–72	98–88	—	—
Panathinaikos AKTOR (Hellenic Basketball Federation)	3–2	(Turkish Basketball Federation) Anadolu Efes	87–83	76–79	81–77	82–85	75–67
Monaco (French Federation of Basketball)	3–2	(Spanish Basketball Federation) Barcelona	97–80	92–79	89–100	72–79	85–84

=== Olympiacos vs. Real Madrid ===
23 April 2025 Game 1	Olympiacos (Hellenic Basketball Federation)	84–72 (Series: 1–0)	(Spanish Basketball Federation) Real Madrid	Piraeus
21:30 EEST	Scoring by quarter: 27–14, 20–15, 17–22, 20–21
	Pts: Vezenkov 23; Rebs: Milutinov 8 Asts: Vildoza 5 PIR: Vezenkov 31	Boxscore	Pts: Llull 16; Rebs: Garuba, Hezonja 5 Asts: Campazzo 5 PIR: Llull 12	Arena: Peace and Friendship Stadium; Attendance: 12,349; Referees: Saša Pukl, Carmelo Paternicò, Milan Nedović

25 April 2025 Game 2	Olympiacos (Hellenic Basketball Federation)	77–71 (Series: 2–0)	(Spanish Basketball Federation) Real Madrid	Piraeus
21:30 EEST	Scoring by quarter: 15–25, 23–13, 19–16, 20–17
	Pts: Vezenkov 22; Rebs: Vezenkov 7 Asts: Walkup 6 PIR: Milutinov 23	Boxscore	Pts: Hezonja 22; Rebs: Hezonja 8 Asts: Llull 4 PIR: Hezonja 24	Arena: Peace and Friendship Stadium; Attendance: 12,349; Referees: Sreten Radović, Oļegs Latiševs, Uroš Nikolić

29 April 2025 Game 3	Real Madrid (Spanish Basketball Federation)	80–72 (Series: 1–2)	(Hellenic Basketball Federation) Olympiacos	Madrid
21:00 CEST	Scoring by quarter: 28–21, 10–23, 20–12, 22–16
	Pts: Tavares 15; Rebs: three players 5 Asts: Abalde 6 PIR: Musa, Tavares 20	Boxscore	Pts: Vezenkov 21; Rebs: Vezenkov 9 Asts: Walkup 6 PIR: Vezenkov 26	Arena: Movistar Arena; Attendance: 10,187; Referees: Ilija Belošević, Mehdi Difallah, Luka Kardum

1 May 2025 Game 4	Real Madrid (Spain)	84–86 (Series: 1–3)	(Hellenic Basketball Federation) Olympiacos	Madrid
21:00 CEST	Scoring by quarter: 21–16, 26–26, 18–26, 19–18
	Pts: Hezonja 21; Rebs: Feliz, Hezonja 6 Asts: Abalde 7 PIR: Hezonja 18	Boxscore	Pts: Fournier 23; Rebs: Milutinov 8 Asts: Vezenkov 6 PIR: Fournier 18	Arena: Movistar Arena; Attendance: 11,368; Referees: Damir Javor, Milivoje Jovčić, Milan Nedović

=== Fenerbahçe Beko vs. Paris Basketball ===
22 April 2025 Game 1	Fenerbahçe Beko (Turkish Basketball Federation)	83–78 (Series: 1–0)	(French Federation of Basketball) Paris Basketball	Istanbul
20:45 TRT	Scoring by quarter: 18–22, 31–20, 14–20, 20–16
	Pts: Baldwin 15; Rebs: Hayes-Davis 6 Asts: Hall 4 PIR: Hall 17	Boxscore	Pts: Hifi 21; Rebs: Ward, Jantunen 5 Asts: Shorts 7 PIR: Ward 23	Arena: Ülker Sports and Event Hall; Attendance: 12,780; Referees: Juan Carlos García, Carlos Cortés, Kristaps Konstantinovs

24 April 2025 Game 2	Fenerbahçe Beko (Turkish Basketball Federation)	89–72 (Series: 2–0)	(French Federation of Basketball) Paris Basketball	Istanbul
20:45 TRT	Scoring by quarter: 29–20, 32–18, 15–19, 13–15
	Pts: Biberović 20; Rebs: Hayes-Davis 7 Asts: Gudurić 5 PIR: Hayes-Davis 26	Boxscore	Pts: Shorts 18; Rebs: Cavalière, Jantunen 6 Asts: Shorts 4 PIR: Shorts 17	Arena: Ülker Sports and Event Hall; Attendance: 12,813; Referees: Miguel Ángel Pérez, Emilio Pérez, Ioannis Foufis

29 April 2025 Game 3	Paris Basketball (French Federation of Basketball)	88–98(OT) (Series: 0–3)	(Turkish Basketball Federation) Fenerbahçe Beko	Paris
20:30 CEST	Scoring by quarter: 18–20, 22–26, 21–17, 19–17, Overtime: 8–18
	Pts: Shorts 29; Rebs: Hayes 8 Asts: Shorts 4 PIR: Hayes 17	Boxscore	Pts: Biberović 21; Rebs: Birch 9 Asts: Baldwin 6 PIR: Hayes-Davis 24	Arena: Adidas Arena; Attendance: 7,424; Referees: Carlos Peruga, Milan Nedović, Jordi Aliaga

=== Panathinaikos AKTOR vs. Anadolu Efes ===
22 April 2025 Game 1	Panathinaikos AKTOR (Hellenic Basketball Federation)	87–83 (Series: 1–0)	(Turkish Basketball Federation) Anadolu Efes	Marousi
21:30 EEST	Scoring by quarter: 21–18, 19–30, 24–24, 23–11
	Pts: Hernangómez 20; Rebs: Hernangómez 16; Asts: Nunn 5 PIR: Hernangómez 40	Boxscore	Pts: Poirier, Larkin 17; Rebs: Poirier 8 Asts: Thompson 5 PIR: Poirier 29	Arena: OAKA Altion; Attendance: 18,890; Referees: Ilija Belošević, Mehdi Difallah, Artūras Šukys

24 April 2025 Game 2	Panathinaikos AKTOR (Hellenic Basketball Federation)	76–79 (Series: 1–1)	(Turkish Basketball Federation) Anadolu Efes	Marousi
21:30 EEST	Scoring by quarter: 29–17, 13–19, 18–14, 16–29
	Pts: Osman 16; Rebs: Mitoglou 6 Asts: Nunn 6 PIR: Grant 18	Boxscore	Pts: Larkin 20; Rebs: Poirier 10; Asts: Larkin, Dozier 5 PIR: Larkin 27	Arena: OAKA Altion; Attendance: 18,888; Referees: Carlos Peruga, Damir Javor, Tomislav Hordov

30 April 2025 Game 3	Anadolu Efes (Turkish Basketball Federation)	77–81 (Series: 1–2)	(Hellenic Basketball Federation) Panathinaikos AKTOR	Istanbul
20:45 TRT	Scoring by quarter: 23–20, 16–25, 15–18, 23–18
	Pts: Larkin 17; Rebs: Bryant 7 Asts: Larkin 4 PIR: Oturu 19	Boxscore	Pts: Nunn 25; Rebs: Mitoglou 6 Asts: Nunn 4 PIR: Nunn 31	Arena: Basketball Development Center; Attendance: 9,967; Referees: Robert Lottermoser, Emilio Pérez, Gytis Vilius

2 May 2025 Game 4	Anadolu Efes (Turkish Basketball Federation)	85–82 (Series: 2–2)	(Hellenic Basketball Federation) Panathinaikos AKTOR	Istanbul
20:30 TRT	Scoring by quarter: 21–18, 17–15, 22–26, 25–23
	Pts: Bryant 19; Rebs: four players 4 Asts: Larkin 9 PIR: Larkin 17	Boxscore	Pts: Osman 22; Rebs: Yurtseven 8 Asts: Sloukas 6 PIR: Sloukas 26	Arena: Basketball Development Center; Attendance: 10,000; Referees: Miguel Ángel Pérez, Juan Carlos García, Artūras Šukys

6 May 2025 Game 5	Panathinaikos AKTOR (Hellenic Basketball Federation)	75–67 (Series: 3–2)	(Turkish Basketball Federation) Anadolu Efes	Marousi
21:45 EEST	Scoring by quarter: 18–10, 23–20, 12–16, 22–21
	Pts: Osman 28; Rebs: Hernangómez 11; Asts: Sloukas 8 PIR: Osman 32	Boxscore	Pts: Bryant 16; Rebs: Šmits 6 Asts: three players 4 PIR: Bryant 13	Arena: OAKA Altion; Attendance: 18,825; Referees: Carlos Peruga, Robert Lottermoser, Emilio Pérez

=== Monaco vs. Barcelona ===
23 April 2025 Game 1	Monaco (French Federation of Basketball)	97–80 (Series: 1–0)	(Spanish Basketball Federation) Barcelona	Fontvieille
19:00 CEST	Scoring by quarter: 21–25, 23–17, 32–17, 21–21
	Pts: Theis, James 22; Rebs: Tarpey 6 Asts: Okobo 7 PIR: Okobo 26	Boxscore	Pts: Punter 16; Rebs: Fall 14; Asts: Veselý 3 PIR: Fall 25	Arena: Salle Gaston Médecin; Attendance: 5,000; Referees: Emin Moğulkoç, Piotr Pastusiak, Miloš Koljenšić

25 April 2025 Game 2	Monaco (French Federation of Basketball)	92–79 (Series: 2–0)	(Spanish Basketball Federation) Barcelona	Fontvieille
19:00 CEST	Scoring by quarter: 26–19, 23–21, 31–24, 12–15
	Pts: Diallo 21; Rebs: Diallo 6 Asts: Okobo 8 PIR: Jaiteh 27	Boxscore	Pts: Parker 16; Rebs: Parker 9 Asts: Parker 6 PIR: Parker 21	Arena: Salle Gaston Médecin; Attendance: 5,000; Referees: Robert Lottermoser, Milivoje Jovčić, Michele Rossi

30 April 2025 Game 3	Barcelona (Spanish Basketball Federation)	100–89 (Series: 1–2)	(French Federation of Basketball) Monaco	Barcelona
19:00 CEST	Scoring by quarter: 24–27, 27–12, 23–27, 26–23
	Pts: Hernangómez 19; Rebs: Hernangómez 10; Asts: Satoranský 7 PIR: Hernangómez 31	Boxscore	Pts: James 20; Rebs: Theis, Blossomgame 6 Asts: James 12; PIR: James 33	Arena: Palau Blaugrana; Attendance: 5,807; Referees: Saša Pukl, Carmelo Paternicò, Saulius Račys

2 May 2025 Game 4	Barcelona (Spanish Basketball Federation)	79–72 (Series: 2–2)	(French Federation of Basketball) Monaco	Barcelona
20:45 CEST	Scoring by quarter: 23–14, 12–24, 23–20, 21–14
	Pts: Parker 22; Rebs: Fall 8 Asts: Satoranský 7 PIR: three players 15	Boxscore	Pts: James 16; Rebs: Theis 6 Asts: James 5 PIR: James 19	Arena: Palau Blaugrana; Attendance: 7,018; Referees: Robert Lottermoser, Emin Moğulkoç, Tomislav Hordov

6 May 2025 Game 5	Monaco (French Federation of Basketball)	85–84 (Series: 3–2)	(Spanish Basketball Federation) Barcelona	Fontvieille
19:00 CEST	Scoring by quarter: 15–19, 30–20, 20–23, 20–22
	Pts: James 20; Rebs: Blossomgame 6 Asts: James 5 PIR: Papagiannis 21	Boxscore	Pts: Punter 19; Rebs: Fall 10; Asts: Brizuela, Satoranský 5 PIR: Punter 23	Arena: Salle Gaston Médecin; Attendance: 5,000; Referees: Ilija Belošević, Milan Nedović, Gytis Vilius
