= All-EuroLeague Team =

Basketball award for top-10 players

The All-EuroLeague Team is an award for Europe's premier level league, the EuroLeague, that is given to the league's top ten basketball players for each season, since the 2000–01 season. During the FIBA era of the EuroLeague, players were honored first by being a part of the FIBA Festival, and later by being selected to the FIBA EuroStars. Under FIBA, the EuroLeague also originally featured a EuroLeague Final Four Team selection, which was a forerunner of the All-EuroLeague Team award, and which consisted of the five best players of the EuroLeague Final Four.

In a year in which European professional club basketball was divided between the Euroleague Basketball-organized 2000–01 EuroLeague, and the FIBA-organized 2000–01 FIBA SuproLeague, it was the Euroleague Basketball organized competition that selected the inaugural All-EuroLeague Team.

Within the inaugural team, only Rashard Griffith of Virtus Bologna had reached the competition's semifinals with his team, and only one other player, Fortitudo Bologna's Gregor Fučka, made it to the competition's quarterfinals with his. With the exception of that original All-EuroLeague Team selection, team success has been capital for a player to achieve All-EuroLeague status, in the great majority of cases. The priority of the team success criteria, as a part of the media member's voting, was unofficially established, after the merger of Euroleague Basketball's EuroLeague, and FIBA Europe's FIBA SuproLeague, at the end of the 2000–01 season.

== Voting criteria ==
Team success, and not individual stats, is the paramount criteria in the selection process. Each season's All-EuroLeague Team consists of ten players total, with five players chosen for both the First and Second Team.

In the selection process, through the 2010–11 EuroLeague season, each voter had to choose 2 point guards, 4 shooting guards and/or small forwards, and 4 power forwards and/or centers. The players were listed by the positions that the EuroLeague deemed to place them at for the voting process, even though in some cases, this may not have properly reflected what position the player usually played at, nor reflect if some players often played at multiple positions.

Since the 2011–12 EuroLeague season, voting is no longer limited by position, as 5 players are picked by both the fan and media voters, regardless of their positions. This change was made to give voters the opportunity to choose any players they want for the team, rather than limiting them to choices based on positions. Online fan voting accounts for 25% of the vote total, while media voting for the remaining 75%.

The online fan vote for the All-EuroLeague Team is collected through online voting at the EuroLeague's official website, which allows for one vote every 24 hours from each individual IP address. The player that receives the most online fan votes for the All-EuroLeague Team, also receives the full 25% of the fan's vote for the EuroLeague MVP choice.

Since the 2024-25 EuroLeague season, the votes from the head coaches and team captains each amount to 35% of the total, while media votes count for 20% and the fans’ total is 10%. Also a new award has been introduced: the EuroLeague Play-in Showdown and Playoffs MVP. The winner is named by Euroleague Basketball based on his and his team's performance during the play-in and playoffs.

== All-EuroLeague Team by season ==
=== All-EuroLeague Team when the voting was by position ===
Player (X)	Denotes the number of times the player was selected to either the First or Second Team.

- Player nationalities by national team.

Seasons	Ref.	Pos.	All-EuroLeague First Team		All-EuroLeague Second Team	
Seasons	Ref.	Pos.	Player	Club	Player	Club
2000–01		PG	(United States) Louis Bullock	(Italy) Müller Verona	(United States) Jemeil Rich	(Switzerland) Lugano Snakes
2000–01		SG/SF	(United States) Alphonso Ford	(Greece) Peristeri	(Greece) Panagiotis Liadelis	(Greece) PAOK
2000–01		SG/SF	(United States) Derrick Hamilton	(Russia) Saint Petersburg Lions	(Spain) Pau Gasol	(Spain) FC Barcelona
2000–01		PF/C	(Italy) Gregor Fučka	(Italy) Paf Bologna	(Greece) Ioannis Giannoulis	(Greece) PAOK
2000–01		PF/C	(Federal Republic of Yugoslavia) Dejan Tomašević	(Federal Republic of Yugoslavia) Budućnost	(United States) Rashard Griffith	(Italy) Kinder Bologna
2001–02		PG	(United States) Tyus Edney	(Italy) Benetton Treviso	(Slovenia) Ariel McDonald	(Israel) Maccabi Elite Tel Aviv
2001–02		SG/SF	(Argentina) Manu Ginóbili	(Italy) Kinder Bologna	(United States) Alphonso Ford (2)	(Greece) Olympiacos
2001–02		SG/SF	(Federal Republic of Yugoslavia) Marko Jarić	(Italy) Kinder Bologna	(Argentina) Marcelo Nicola	(Italy) Benetton Treviso
2001–02		PF/C	(Federal Republic of Yugoslavia) Dejan Bodiroga	(Greece) Panathinaikos	(Turkey) Mirsad Türkcan	(Russia) CSKA Moscow
2001–02		PF/C	(Federal Republic of Yugoslavia) Dejan Tomašević (2)	(Spain) Tau Cerámica	(United States) Joseph Blair	(Italy) Scavolini Pesaro
2002–03		PG	(United States) Tyus Edney (2)	(Italy) Benetton Treviso	(Serbia and Montenegro) Miloš Vujanić	(Serbia and Montenegro) Partizan Mobtel
2002–03		SG/SF	(United States) Alphonso Ford (3)	(Italy) Montepaschi Siena	(United States) Marcus Brown	(Turkey) Efes Pilsen
2002–03		SG/SF	(Serbia and Montenegro) Dejan Bodiroga (2)	(Spain) FC Barcelona	(Argentina) Andrés Nocioni	(Spain) Tau Cerámica
2002–03		PF/C	(Spain) Jorge Garbajosa	(Italy) Benetton Treviso	(Turkey) Mirsad Türkcan (2)	(Italy) Montepaschi Siena
2002–03		PF/C	(United States) Victor Alexander	(Russia) CSKA Moscow	(Croatia) Nikola Vujčić	(Israel) Maccabi Elite Tel Aviv
2003–04		PG	(Lithuania) Šarūnas Jasikevičius	(Israel) Maccabi Elite Tel Aviv	(Serbia and Montenegro) Miloš Vujanić (2)	(Italy) Skipper Bologna
2003–04		SG/SF	(United States) Marcus Brown (2)	(Russia) CSKA Moscow	(United States) Lynn Greer	(Poland) Śląsk Wrocław
2003–04		SG/SF	(Serbia and Montenegro) Dejan Bodiroga (3)	(Spain) FC Barcelona	(United States) David Vanterpool	(Italy) Montepaschi Siena
2003–04		PF/C	(Turkey) Mirsad Türkcan (3)	(Russia) CSKA Moscow	(Argentina) Andrés Nocioni (2)	(Spain) Tau Cerámica
2003–04		PF/C	(Lithuania) Arvydas Sabonis	(Lithuania) Žalgiris	(Croatia) Nikola Vujčić (2)	(Israel) Maccabi Elite Tel Aviv
2004–05		PG	(Lithuania) Šarūnas Jasikevičius (2)	(Israel) Maccabi Elite Tel Aviv	(Slovenia) Jaka Lakovič	(Greece) Panathinaikos
2004–05		SG/SF	(Lithuania) Arvydas Macijauskas	(Spain) Tau Cerámica	(United States) Marcus Brown (3)	(Russia) CSKA Moscow
2004–05		SG/SF	(United States) Anthony Parker	(Israel) Maccabi Elite Tel Aviv	(United States) Charles Smith	(Italy) Scavolini Pesaro
2004–05		PF/C	(Australia) David Andersen	(Russia) CSKA Moscow	(Argentina) Luis Scola	(Spain) Tau Cerámica
2004–05		PF/C	(Croatia) Nikola Vujčić (3)	(Israel) Maccabi Elite Tel Aviv	(United States) Tanoka Beard	(Lithuania) Žalgiris
2005–06		PG	(Greece) Theo Papaloukas	(Russia) CSKA Moscow	(Argentina) Pablo Prigioni	(Spain) Tau Cerámica
2005–06		SG/SF	(Spain) Juan Carlos Navarro	(Spain) Winterthur FC Barcelona	(Greece) Vassilis Spanoulis	(Greece) Panathinaikos
2005–06		SG/SF	(United States) Anthony Parker (2)	(Israel) Maccabi Elite Tel Aviv	(United States) Trajan Langdon	(Russia) CSKA Moscow
2005–06		PF/C	(Argentina) Luis Scola (2)	(Spain) Tau Cerámica	(Spain) Jorge Garbajosa (2)	(Spain) Unicaja
2005–06		PF/C	(Croatia) Nikola Vujčić (4)	(Israel) Maccabi Elite Tel Aviv	(Lithuania) Darjuš Lavrinovič	(Lithuania) Žalgiris
Seasons	Ref.	Pos.	All-EuroLeague First Team		All-EuroLeague Second Team	
Seasons	Ref.	Pos.	Player	Club	Player	Club
2006–07		PG	(Greece) Theo Papaloukas (2)^{†} (Greece) Dimitris Diamantidis^{†}	(Russia) CSKA Moscow (Greece) Panathinaikos	(Argentina) Pablo Prigioni (2)	(Spain) Baskonia
2006–07		SG/SF	(Spain) Juan Carlos Navarro (2)	(Spain) Barcelona	(Serbia) Igor Rakočević	(Spain) Baskonia
2006–07		SG/SF	(United States) Trajan Langdon (2)	(Russia) CSKA Moscow	(Lithuania) Ramūnas Šiškauskas	(Greece) Panathinaikos
2006–07		PF/C	(Argentina) Luis Scola (3)	(Spain) Baskonia	(Slovenia) Matjaž Smodiš	(Russia) CSKA Moscow
2006–07		PF/C	(Croatia) Nikola Vujčić (5)	(Israel) Maccabi	(Greece) Lazaros Papadopoulos	(Russia) Dynamo Moscow
2007–08		PG	(United States) Terrell McIntyre	(Italy) Montepaschi Siena	(Greece) Theo Papaloukas (3)	(Russia) CSKA Moscow
2007–08		SG/SF	(United States) Trajan Langdon (3)	(Russia) CSKA Moscow	(United States) Bootsy Thornton	(Italy) Montepaschi Siena
2007–08		SG/SF	(Lithuania) Ramūnas Šiškauskas (2)	(Russia) CSKA Moscow	(Israel) Yotam Halperin	(Israel) Maccabi
2007–08		PF/C	(United States) Terence Morris	(Israel) Maccabi	(Lithuania) Kšyštof Lavrinovič	(Italy) Montepaschi Siena
2007–08		PF/C	(Brazil) Tiago Splitter	(Spain) Baskonia	(Montenegro) Nikola Peković	(Serbia) Partizan Belgrade
2008–09		PG	(United States) Terrell McIntyre (2)	(Italy) Montepaschi Siena	(Greece) Theo Papaloukas (4)	(Greece) Olympiacos
2008–09		SG/SF	(Spain) Juan Carlos Navarro (3)	(Spain) Barcelona	(Greece) Vassilis Spanoulis (2)	(Greece) Panathinaikos
2008–09		SG/SF	(Serbia) Igor Rakočević (2)	(Spain) Baskonia	(Lithuania) Ramūnas Šiškauskas (3)	(Russia) CSKA Moscow
2008–09		PF/C	(Greece) Ioannis Bourousis	(Greece) Olympiacos	(Slovenia) Erazem Lorbek	(Russia) CSKA Moscow
2008–09		PF/C	(Montenegro) Nikola Peković (2)	(Greece) Panathinaikos	(Brazil) Tiago Splitter (2)	(Spain) Baskonia
2009–10		PG	(Serbia) Miloš Teodosić	(Greece) Olympiacos	(North Macedonia) Bo McCalebb	(Serbia) Partizan Belgrade
2009–10		SG/SF	(Spain) Juan Carlos Navarro (4)	(Spain) Barcelona	(United States) Josh Childress	(Greece) Olympiacos
2009–10		SG/SF	(Lithuania) Linas Kleiza	(Greece) Olympiacos	(Lithuania) Ramūnas Šiškauskas (4)	(Russia) CSKA Moscow
2009–10		PF/C	(Russia) Victor Khryapa	(Russia) CSKA Moscow	(Slovenia) Erazem Lorbek (2)	(Spain) Barcelona
2009–10		PF/C	(Australia) Aleks Marić	(Serbia) Partizan Belgrade	(Brazil) Tiago Splitter (3)	(Spain) Baskonia
2010–11		PG	(Greece) Dimitris Diamantidis (2)	(Greece) Panathinaikos	(United States) Jeremy Pargo	(Israel) Maccabi
2010–11		SG/SF	(Spain) Juan Carlos Navarro (5)	(Spain) Barcelona	(Greece) Vassilis Spanoulis (3)	(Greece) Olympiacos
2010–11		SG/SF	(Spain) Fernando San Emeterio	(Spain) Baskonia	(Spain) Sergio Llull	(Spain) Real Madrid
2010–11		PF/C	(United States) Mike Batiste	(Greece) Panathinaikos	(Serbia) Duško Savanović	(Spain) Valencia
2010–11		PF/C	(Greece) Sofoklis Schortsanitis	(Israel) Maccabi	(Lithuania) Kšyštof Lavrinovič (2)	(Italy) Montepaschi Siena

† A tie resulted in the voting for the best point guard of the 2006–07 season between Dimitris Diamantidis and Theo Papaloukas. Consequently, the All-EuroLeague First Team included six players that season.

=== All-EuroLeague Team since the voting has not been by position ===
Player (X)	Denotes the number of times the player was selected to either the First or Second Team.

- Player nationalities by national team.

Seasons	Ref.	All-EuroLeague First Team			All-EuroLeague Second Team	
Seasons	Ref.	Pos.	Player	Club	Player	Club
2011–12		PG	(Greece) Dimitris Diamantidis (3)	(Greece) Panathinaikos	(Serbia) Miloš Teodosić (2)	(Russia) CSKA Moscow
2011–12		SG	(Greece) Vassilis Spanoulis (4)	(Greece) Olympiacos	(North Macedonia) Bo McCalebb (2)	(Italy) Montepaschi Siena
2011–12		SF	(Russia) Andrei Kirilenko	(Russia) CSKA Moscow	(Spain) Juan Carlos Navarro (6)	(Spain) Barcelona
2011–12		PF	(Slovenia) Erazem Lorbek (3)	(Spain) Barcelona	(Bosnia and Herzegovina) Henry Domercant	(Russia) UNICS Kazan
2011–12		C	(Serbia) Nenad Krstić	(Russia) CSKA Moscow	(United States) Mike Batiste (2)	(Greece) Panathinaikos
2012–13		PG	(Greece) Dimitris Diamantidis (4)	(Greece) Panathinaikos	(Serbia) Miloš Teodosić (3)	(Russia) CSKA Moscow
2012–13		SG	(Greece) Vassilis Spanoulis (5)	(Greece) Olympiacos	(Spain) Juan Carlos Navarro (7)	(Spain) Barcelona
2012–13		SF	(Spain) Rudy Fernández	(Spain) Real Madrid	(Russia) Victor Khryapa (2)	(Russia) CSKA Moscow
2012–13		PF	(Serbia) Nenad Krstić (2)	(Russia) CSKA Moscow	(Spain) Nikola Mirotić	(Spain) Real Madrid
2012–13		C	(Croatia) Ante Tomić	(Spain) Barcelona	(United States) Shawn James	(Israel) Maccabi Tel Aviv
2013–14		PG	(Spain) Sergio Rodríguez	(Spain) Real Madrid	(Greece) Vassilis Spanoulis (6)	(Greece) Olympiacos
2013–14		SG	(United States) Keith Langford	(Italy) Olimpia Milano	(Georgia (country)) Ricky Hickman	(Israel) Maccabi Tel Aviv
2013–14		SF	(Spain) Rudy Fernández (2)	(Spain) Real Madrid	(Russia) Victor Khryapa (3)	(Russia) CSKA Moscow
2013–14		PF	(United States) Sonny Weems	(Russia) CSKA Moscow	(Spain) Nikola Mirotić (2)	(Spain) Real Madrid
2013–14		C	(Croatia) Ante Tomić (2)	(Spain) Barcelona	(Gabon) Stéphane Lasme	(Greece) Panathinaikos
2014–15		PG	(Serbia) Miloš Teodosić (4)	(Russia) CSKA Moscow	(France) Nando de Colo	(Russia) CSKA Moscow
2014–15		SG	(Greece) Vassilis Spanoulis (7)	(Greece) Olympiacos	(United States) Andrew Goudelock	(Turkey) Fenerbahçe
2014–15		SF	(Serbia) Nemanja Bjelica	(Turkey) Fenerbahçe	(Spain) Rudy Fernández (3)	(Spain) Real Madrid
2014–15		PF	(Spain) Felipe Reyes	(Spain) Real Madrid	(United States) Devin Smith	(Israel) Maccabi Tel Aviv
2014–15		C	(Serbia) Boban Marjanović	(Serbia) Crvena zvezda	(Croatia) Ante Tomić (3)	(Spain) Barcelona
2015–16		PG	(Serbia) Miloš Teodosić (5)	(Russia) CSKA Moscow	(Italy) Luigi Datome	(Turkey) Fenerbahçe
2015–16		SG	(United States) Malcolm Delaney	(Russia) Lokomotiv Kuban	(United States) Quincy Miller	(Serbia) Crvena zvezda
2015–16		SF	(France) Nando de Colo (2)	(Russia) CSKA Moscow	(United States) Anthony Randolph	(Russia) Lokomotiv Kuban
2015–16		PF	(Czech Republic) Jan Veselý	(Turkey) Fenerbahçe	(United States) Ekpe Udoh	(Turkey) Fenerbahçe
2015–16		C	(Greece) Ioannis Bourousis (2)	(Spain) Baskonia	(Mexico) Gustavo Ayón	(Spain) Real Madrid
2016–17		PG	(Spain) Sergio Llull (2)	(Spain) Real Madrid	(Serbia) Miloš Teodosić (6)	(Russia) CSKA Moscow
2016–17		SG	(France) Nando de Colo (3)	(Russia) CSKA Moscow	(United States) Brad Wanamaker	(Turkey) Darüşşafaka
2016–17		SF	(Serbia) Bogdan Bogdanović	(Turkey) Fenerbahçe	(Italy) Nicolò Melli	(Germany) Brose Bamberg
2016–17		PF	(Greece) Georgios Printezis	(Greece) Olympiacos	(Armenia) Bryant Dunston	(Turkey) Anadolu Efes
2016–17		C	(United States) Ekpe Udoh (2)	(Turkey) Fenerbahçe	(Mexico) Gustavo Ayón (2)	(Spain) Real Madrid
2017–18		PG	(Greece) Nick Calathes	(Greece) Panathinaikos	(Canada) Kevin Pangos	(Lithuania) Žalgiris
2017–18		SG	(France) Nando de Colo (4)	(Russia) CSKA Moscow	(Spain) Sergio Rodríguez (2)	(Russia) CSKA Moscow
2017–18		SF	(Slovenia) Luka Dončić	(Spain) Real Madrid	(Greece) Vassilis Spanoulis (8)	(Greece) Olympiacos
2017–18		PF	(Georgia (country)) Tornike Shengelia	(Spain) Baskonia	(Russia) Alexey Shved	(Russia) Khimki
2017–18		C	(Czech Republic) Jan Veselý (2)	(Turkey) Fenerbahçe	(Lithuania) Paulius Jankūnas	(Lithuania) Žalgiris
2018–19		PG	(Greece) Nick Calathes (2)	(Greece) Panathinaikos	(France) Nando de Colo (5)	(Russia) CSKA Moscow
2018–19		SG	(Greece) Kostas Sloukas	(Turkey) Fenerbahçe	(United States) Mike James	(Italy) Olimpia Milano
2018–19		SF	(United States) Will Clyburn	(Russia) CSKA Moscow	(Serbia) Vasilije Micić	(Turkey) Anadolu Efes
2018–19		PF	(Uganda) Brandon Davies	(Lithuania) Zalgiris	(France) Vincent Poirier	(Spain) Baskonia
2018–19		C	(Czech Republic) Jan Veselý (3)	(Turkey) Fenerbahçe	(Cape Verde) Edy Tavares	(Spain) Real Madrid
2019–20	Not awarded ^{1}					
2020–21		PG	(Canada) Kevin Pangos (2)	(Russia) Zenit Saint Petersburg	(Turkey) Shane Larkin	(Turkey) Anadolu Efes
2020–21		SG	(Serbia) Vasilije Micić (2)	(Turkey) Anadolu Efes	(France) Nando De Colo (6)	(Turkey) Fenerbahçe
2020–21		SF	(Serbia) Vladimir Lučić	(Germany) Bayern Munich	(United States) Will Clyburn (2)	(Russia) CSKA Moscow
2020–21		PF	(Spain) Nikola Mirotić (3)	(Spain) Barcelona	(Denmark) Shavon Shields	(Italy) Olimpia Milano
2020–21		C	(Cape Verde) Edy Tavares (2)	(Spain) Real Madrid	(Uganda) Brandon Davies (2)	(Spain) Barcelona
2021–22		PG	(United States) Mike James (2)	(France) Monaco	(Greece) Kostas Sloukas (2)	(Greece) Olympiacos
2021–22		SG	(Turkey) Shane Larkin (2)	(Turkey) Anadolu Efes	(Serbia) Vasilije Micić (3)	(Turkey) Anadolu Efes
2021–22		SF	(Bulgaria) Sasha Vezenkov	(Greece) Olympiacos	(Serbia) Vladimir Lučić (2)	(Germany) Bayern Munich
2021–22		PF	(Spain) Nikola Mirotić (4)	(Spain) Barcelona	(Denmark) Shavon Shields (2)	(Italy) Olimpia Milano
2021–22		C	(Cape Verde) Edy Tavares (3)	(Spain) Real Madrid	(Greece) Georgios Papagiannis	(Greece) Panathinaikos
2022–23		PG	(Spain) Lorenzo Brown	(Israel) Maccabi Tel Aviv	(United States) Mike James (3)	(France) Monaco
2022–23		SG	(Bosnia and Herzegovina) Džanan Musa	(Spain) Real Madrid	(United States) Darius Thompson	(Spain) Baskonia
2022–23		SF	(Bulgaria) Sasha Vezenkov (2)	(Greece) Olympiacos	(United States) Wade Baldwin IV	(Israel) Maccabi Tel Aviv
2022–23		PF	(France) Mathias Lessort	(Serbia) Partizan	(United States) Kevin Punter	(Serbia) Partizan
2022–23		C	(Cape Verde) Edy Tavares (4)	(Spain) Real Madrid	(Spain) Nikola Mirotić (5)	(Spain) Barcelona
2023–24		PG	(Argentina) Facundo Campazzo	(Spain) Real Madrid	(Spain) Lorenzo Brown (2)	(Israel) Maccabi Tel Aviv
2023–24		SG	(United States) Mike James (4)	(France) Monaco	(Greece) Kostas Sloukas (3)	(Greece) Panathinaikos
2023–24		SF	(United States) Kendrick Nunn	(Greece) Panathinaikos	(United States) Wade Baldwin IV (2)	(Israel) Maccabi Tel Aviv
2023–24		PF	(United States) Nigel Hayes-Davis	(Turkey) Fenerbahçe	(Croatia) Mario Hezonja	(Spain) Real Madrid
2023–24		C	(France) Mathias Lessort (2)	(Greece) Panathinaikos	(Cape Verde) Edy Tavares (5)	(Spain) Real Madrid
2024–25		PG	(North Macedonia) T. J. Shorts	(France) Paris Basketball	(United States) Mike James (5)	(France) Monaco
2024–25		SG	(United States) Carsen Edwards	(Germany) Bayern Munich	(France) Théo Maledon	(France) ASVEL
2024–25		SF	(United States) Kendrick Nunn (2)	(Greece) Panathinaikos	(France) Evan Fournier	(Greece) Olympiacos
2024–25		PF	(Bulgaria) Sasha Vezenkov (3)	(Greece) Olympiacos	(Spain) Juancho Hernangómez	(Greece) Panathinaikos
2024–25		C	(United States) Nigel Hayes-Davis (2)	(Turkey) Fenerbahçe	(Cape Verde) Edy Tavares (6)	(Spain) Real Madrid
2025–26		PG	(France) Sylvain Francisco	(Lithuania) Žalgiris	(United States) Wade Baldwin IV (3)	(Turkey) Fenerbahçe
2025–26		SG	(Dominican Republic) Jean Montero	(Spain) Valencia	(Greece) Tyler Dorsey	(Greece) Olympiacos
2025–26		SF	(United States) Elijah Bryant	(Israel) Hapoel Tel Aviv	(United States) Kendrick Nunn (3)	(Greece) Panathinaikos
2025–26		PF	(Bulgaria) Sasha Vezenkov (4)	(Greece) Olympiacos	(United States) Talen Horton-Tucker	(Turkey) Fenerbahçe
2025–26		C	(Serbia) Nikola Milutinov	(Greece) Olympiacos	(Cape Verde) Edy Tavares (7)	(Spain) Real Madrid

Notes:

^1 There was no awarding in the 2019–20, because the season was cancelled due to the coronavirus pandemic in Europe.

== Players with multiple All-EuroLeague Team selections ==
Players are listed by the nationality that they are registered under in their national domestic leagues, being the one the EuroLeague officially considers. The following table only lists players with at least two total selections.

- Player nationalities by national team.

Player	Number Of Selections	First Team	Second Team	Full Season MVP	Final Four MVP
(Greece) Vassilis Spanoulis	8	3	5	1	3
(Spain) Juan Carlos Navarro	7	5	2	1	1
(Cape Verde) Edy Tavares	7	3	4	0	1
(France) Nando de Colo	6	3	3	1	1
(Serbia) Miloš Teodosić	6	3	3	1	0
(Croatia) Nikola Vujčić	5	3	2	0	0
(Spain) Nikola Mirotić	5	2	3	1	0
(United States) Mike James	5	2	3	1	0
(Bulgaria) Sasha Vezenkov	4	4	0	2	0
(Greece) Dimitris Diamantidis	4	4	0	1	2
(Greece) Theo Papaloukas	4	2	2	1	1
(Lithuania) Ramūnas Šiškauskas	4	1	3	1	0
(Serbia and Montenegro) Dejan Bodiroga	3	3	0	0	2
(Czech Republic) Jan Veselý	3	3	0	1	0
(United States) Kendrick Nunn	3	2	1	1	0
(United States) Trajan Langdon	3	2	1	0	1
(Spain) Rudy Fernández	3	2	1	0	0
(United States) Alphonso Ford	3	2	1	0	0
(Argentina) Luis Scola	3	2	1	0	0
(Croatia) Ante Tomić	3	2	1	0	0
(Serbia) Vasilije Micić	3	1	2	1	2
(United States) Marcus Brown	3	1	2	0	0
(Russia) Victor Khryapa	3	1	2	0	0
(Slovenia) Erazem Lorbek	3	1	2	0	0
(Greece) Kostas Sloukas	3	1	2	0	1
(Brazil) Tiago Splitter	3	1	2	0	0
(Turkey) Mirsad Türkcan	3	1	2	0	0
(United States) Wade Baldwin IV	3	0	3	0	0
(United States) Anthony Parker	2	2	0	2	1
(United States) Tyus Edney	2	2	0	0	1
(Lithuania) Šarūnas Jasikevičius	2	2	0	0	1
(United States) Nigel Hayes-Davis	2	2	0	0	1
(Greece) Ioannis Bourousis	2	2	0	0	0
(Greece) Nick Calathes	2	2	0	0	0
(Serbia) Nenad Krstić	2	2	0	0	0
(France) Mathias Lessort	2	2	0	0	0
(United States) Terrell McIntyre	2	2	0	0	0
(Serbia and Montenegro) Dejan Tomašević	2	2	0	0	0
(Spain) Sergio Llull	2	1	1	1	0
(Spain) Sergio Rodríguez	2	1	1	1	0
(United States) Will Clyburn	2	1	1	0	1
(Nigeria) Ekpe Udoh	2	1	1	0	1
(United States) Mike Batiste	2	1	1	0	0
(Spain) Lorenzo Brown	2	1	1	0	0
(Uganda) Brandon Davies	2	1	1	0	0
(Spain) Jorge Garbajosa	2	1	1	0	0
(Turkey) Shane Larkin	2	1	1	0	0
(Serbia) Vladimir Lučić	2	1	1	0	0
(Canada) Kevin Pangos	2	1	1	0	0
(Montenegro) Nikola Peković	2	1	1	0	0
(Serbia) Igor Rakočević	2	1	1	0	0
(Denmark) Shavon Shields	2	1	1	0	0
(Argentina) Andrés Nocioni	2	0	2	0	1
(Mexico) Gustavo Ayón	2	0	2	0	0
(Lithuania) Kšyštof Lavrinovič	2	0	2	0	0
(North Macedonia) Bo McCalebb	2	0	2	0	0
(Argentina) Pablo Prigioni	2	0	2	0	0
(Serbia and Montenegro) Miloš Vujanić	2	0	2	0	0

== See also ==
- EuroLeague Final Four Team
- FIBA Festival
- FIBA EuroStars
- EuroLeague Awards
- 50 Greatest Euroleague Contributors
- Euroleague Basketball 2001–10 All-Decade Team
