= 2024–25 EuroLeague =

68th season of the European premier basketball league

2024–25 Turkish Airlines EuroLeague^{1}
- The anniversary logo for the 25th season
- Season: 2024–25
- Duration: 3 October 2024 – 25 May 2025
- Games played: 306
- Teams: 18

Regular season
- Top seed: (Greece) Olympiacos
- Season MVP: (United States) Kendrick Nunn

Final Four
- Champions: (Turkey) Fenerbahçe (2nd title)
- Runners-up: (France) Monaco
- Third place: (Greece) Olympiacos
- Fourth place: (Greece) Panathinaikos
- Final Four MVP: (United States) Nigel Hayes-Davis

Awards
- Playoffs MVP: (Bulgaria) Sasha Vezenkov
- Alphonso Ford Trophy: (United States) Kendrick Nunn
- Best Defender: (Germany) Nick Weiler-Babb
- Rising Star: (France) Nadir Hifi
- Coach of the Year: (Lithuania) Šarūnas Jasikevičius
- Play-in MVP: (North Macedonia) T. J. Shorts

Statistical leaders
Points	(United States) Carsen Edwards 20.4 (Top Scorer) (United States) Kendrick Nunn 20.0 (Alphonso Ford Top Scorer Trophy)	
Rebounds	(Spain) Juancho Hernangómez	7.0
Assists	(North Macedonia) T. J. Shorts	7.3
Steals	(Germany) Nick Weiler-Babb	1.5
Blocks	(France) Vincent Poirier	1.3
Index Rating	(Bulgaria) Sasha Vezenkov	23.7

Records
- Biggest home win: Anadolu Efes 110–66 Olimpia Milano (23 January 2025)
- Biggest away win: ALBA Berlin 64–108 Virtus Bologna (28 March 2025)
- Highest scoring: Real Madrid 116–113 Maccabi Tel Aviv (14 January 2025)
- Winning streak: 10 games Paris
- Losing streak: 10 games ALBA Berlin
- Highest attendance: 20,999; Crvena zvezda 80–86 Žalgiris (27 February 2025)
- Lowest attendance: 0 Maccabi Tel Aviv 79–78 Real Madrid (31 October 2024)
- All statistics correct as of 13 May 2025.^{1} Sponsored league name, referring to Turkish Airlines.

The 2024–25 Turkish Airlines EuroLeague was the 25th season of the modern era of the EuroLeague, and the 15th under the title sponsorship of Turkish Airlines. Including the competition's previous incarnation as the FIBA Europe Champions Cup, this is the 68th season of the premier basketball competition for European men's clubs. The season began on 3 October 2024 and ended on 25 May 2025 with the Final Four. The Final Four was hosted by Etihad Arena in Abu Dhabi, the capital of the United Arab Emirates, which marks the first time in European basketball history that the game is played outside of the continent in 21 years, after the 2004 Final Four in Tel Aviv, Israel.

For the fourth straight season, CSKA Moscow had their EuroLeague license rescinded following the Russian invasion of Ukraine. Additionally, for the second consecutive season due to the war in Gaza, Maccabi Tel Aviv played abroad during the season, principally at Aleksandar Nikolic Hall in Belgrade; the majority of games were played behind closed doors.

This will be the second straight season under the new format with the play-in tournament for seventh- to tenth-placed teams in the regular season.

Panathinaikos are the defending champions, but were eliminated in the semi-finals by Fenerbahçe in the semifinal. Fenerbahçe went on to win its first title in 8 years, after beating first-time finalists Monaco in the championship game.

== Teams ==
=== Team changes (pre-season) ===
A total of 18 teams will participate in the league, including 17 teams from the 2023–24 season and one promoted from the 2023–24 EuroCup.

On 12 April 2024, Paris Basketball won the EuroCup defeating JL Bourg, and thus qualified for EuroLeague. It will be the debut season of the team from the French capital in the European top flight. Valencia Basket were relegated to the EuroCup.

▲ Promoted from EuroCup	▼ Relegated to EuroCup
Paris Basketball	Valencia Basket

=== Qualified teams ===
The labels in the parentheses show how each team qualified for the place of its starting round:

Qualified teams for 2024–25 EuroLeague Licensed clubs
(Spain) Barcelona	(Greece) Olympiacos	(Turkey) Anadolu Efes	(Israel) Maccabi Tel Aviv
(Spain) Baskonia	(Greece) Panathinaikos	(Turkey) Fenerbahçe	(Italy) Olimpia Milano
(Spain) Real Madrid	(France) ASVEL	(Germany) Bayern Munich	(Lithuania) Žalgiris

Associated clubs
(Serbia) Crvena zvezda (ABA)	(France) AS Monaco (WC)	(Germany) ALBA Berlin (WC)	(Italy) Virtus Bologna (WC)
(Serbia) Partizan (WC)	(France) Paris Basketball (EC)		

Notes

1. France (FRA): AS Monaco is a club based in Monaco (which does not qualify for European competitions), but participate in European competitions through one of the berths for France (any coefficient points it earns count toward France)

=== Venues and locations ===
Location of teams in 2024–25 EuroLeague

Team	Home city	Arena	Capacity	Kit manufacturer	Season	Last season
(German Basketball Federation) ALBA Berlin	Berlin	Uber Arena	14,500	Adidas	18th	18th
(Turkish Basketball Federation) Anadolu Efes	Istanbul	Basketball Development Center	10,000	Bilcee	7th	10th
(Spanish Basketball Federation) Barcelona	Barcelona	Palau Blaugrana	7,585	Nike	10th	6th
(Spanish Basketball Federation) Baskonia	Vitoria-Gasteiz	Buesa Arena	15,431	Puma	15th	8th
(German Basketball Federation) Bayern Munich	Munich	SAP Garden	11,500	Adidas	4th	15th
(Basketball Federation of Serbia) Crvena zvezda Meridianbet	Belgrade	Belgrade Arena	18,386	Adidas	9th	16th
(Basketball Federation of Serbia) Crvena zvezda Meridianbet	Belgrade	Aleksandar Nikolić Hall	8,000	Adidas	9th	16th
(Italian Basketball Federation) EA7 Emporio Armani Milan	Milan	Unipol Forum	12,700	EA7	11th	12th
(Turkish Basketball Federation) Fenerbahçe Beko	Istanbul	Ülker Sports and Event Hall	13,000	Adidas	5th	4th
(French Federation of Basketball) LDLC ASVEL	Villeurbanne	LDLC Arena	12,523	Adidas	13th	17th
(French Federation of Basketball) LDLC ASVEL	Villeurbanne	Astroballe	5,556	Adidas	13th	17th
(Israeli Basketball Association) Maccabi Playtika Tel Aviv	Tel Aviv	(Basketball Federation of Serbia) Aleksandar Nikolić Hall	8,000	Puma	17th	7th
(French Federation of Basketball) Monaco	Monaco	Salle Gaston Médecin	5,000	Spalding	2nd	5th
(Hellenic Basketball Federation) Olympiacos	Piraeus	Peace and Friendship Stadium	12,300	GSA	3rd	3rd place, bronze medalist(s)
(Hellenic Basketball Federation) Panathinaikos AKTOR	Athens	OAKA Altion	18,300	Adidas	6th	1st place, gold medalist(s)
(French Federation of Basketball) Paris Basketball	Paris	Adidas Arena	8,000	Adidas	1st	▲ (gold) (EuroCup)
(French Federation of Basketball) Paris Basketball	Paris	Accor Arena	15,705	Adidas	1st	▲ (gold) (EuroCup)
(Basketball Federation of Serbia) Partizan Mozzart Bet	Belgrade	Belgrade Arena	18,386	Under Armour	14th	11th
(Basketball Federation of Serbia) Partizan Mozzart Bet	Belgrade	Aleksandar Nikolić Hall	8,000	Under Armour	14th	11th
(Spanish Basketball Federation) Real Madrid	Madrid	Movistar Arena	15,000	Adidas	12th	2nd place, silver medalist(s)
(Italian Basketball Federation) Virtus Segafredo Bologna	Bologna	Virtus Segafredo Arena	9,980	Adidas	16th	9th
(Italian Basketball Federation) Virtus Segafredo Bologna	Bologna	Unipol Arena	8,278	Adidas	16th	9th
(Lithuanian Basketball Federation) Žalgiris	Kaunas	Žalgirio Arena	15,415	Puma	8th	14th

=== Managerial changes ===
Team	Outgoing manager	Manner of departure	Date of vacancy	Position in table	Replaced with	Date of appointment
(Spanish Basketball Federation) Baskonia	(Basketball Federation of Montenegro) Duško Ivanović	End of contract	27 May 2024	Pre-season	(Spanish Basketball Federation) Pablo Laso	28 June 2024
(Spanish Basketball Federation) Barcelona	(Spanish Basketball Federation) Roger Grimau	Sacked	8 June 2024	Pre-season	(Spanish Basketball Federation) Joan Peñarroya	14 June 2024
(German Basketball Federation) Bayern Munich	(Spanish Basketball Federation) Pablo Laso	Resigned	28 June 2024	Pre-season	(Canada Basketball) Gordon Herbert	25 July 2024
(French Federation of Basketball) Paris Basketball	(Basketball Finland) Tuomas Iisalo	Resigned	8 July 2024	Pre-season	(Brazilian Basketball Confederation) Tiago Splitter	15 July 2024
(French Federation of Basketball) Monaco	(Basketball Federation of Serbia) Saša Obradović	Sacked	18 November 2024	7th (6–4)	(Hellenic Basketball Federation) Vassilis Spanoulis	26 November 2024
(Italian Basketball Federation) Virtus Bologna	(Italian Basketball Federation) Luca Banchi	Resigned	5 December 2024	18th (2–11)	(Basketball Federation of Montenegro) Duško Ivanović	5 December 2024
(Turkish Basketball Federation) Anadolu Efes	(Croatian Basketball Federation) Tomislav Mijatović	Resigned	7 January 2025	10th (10–9)	(Italian Basketball Federation) Luca Banchi	7 January 2025

=== Referees ===
A total of 68 Euroleague Basketball officials are set to work on the 2024-25 season in EuroLeague and EuroCup:

- (Albanian Basketball Association) Gentian Cici
- (Argentine Basketball Confederation) Leandro Lezcano
- (Basketball Belgium) Nick van den Broeck
- (Basketball Federation of Bosnia and Herzegovina) Dragan Porobić
- (Croatian Basketball Federation) Denis Hadžić
- (Croatian Basketball Federation) Josip Radojković
- (Croatian Basketball Federation) Luka Kardum
- (Croatian Basketball Federation) Sreten Radović
- (Croatian Basketball Federation) Tomislav Hordov
- (Czech Basketball Federation) Robert Vyklický
- (Estonian Basketball Association) Aare Halliko
- (Estonian Basketball Association) Rain Peerandi
- (French Federation of Basketball) Hugues Thépénier
- (French Federation of Basketball) Joseph Bissang
- (French Federation of Basketball) Maxime Boubert
- (French Federation of Basketball) Mehdi Difallah
- (French Federation of Basketball) Thomas Bissuel
- (German Basketball Federation) Anne Panther
- (German Basketball Federation) Christian Theis
- (German Basketball Federation) Robert Lottermoser
- (German Basketball Federation) Steve Bittner
- (British Basketball) Eduard Udyanskyy
- (Hellenic Basketball Federation) Ioannis Foufis
- (Hellenic Basketball Federation) Vassilis Pitsilkas
- (Hellenic Basketball Federation) Vasiliki Tsaroucha
- (Israeli Basketball Association) Adar Peer
- (Israeli Basketball Association) Amit Balak
- (Israeli Basketball Association) Noam Gordon
- (Israeli Basketball Association) Seffi Shemmesh
- (Italian Basketball Federation) Carmelo Paternicò
- (Italian Basketball Federation) Guido Giovannetti
- (Italian Basketball Federation) Manuel Attard
- (Italian Basketball Federation) Michele Rossi
- (Latvian Basketball Association) Kristaps Konstantinovs
- (Latvian Basketball Association) Oļegs Latiševs
- (Lithuanian Basketball Federation) Artūras Šukys
- (Lithuanian Basketball Federation) Gytis Vilius
- (Lithuanian Basketball Federation) Jurgis Laurinavičius
- (Basketball Federation of Montenegro) Igor Dragojević
- (Basketball Federation of Montenegro) Miloš Koljenšić
- (Polish Basketball Federation) Jakub Zamojski
- (Polish Basketball Federation) Marcin Kowalski
- (Polish Basketball Federation) Piotr Pastusiak
- (Polish Basketball Federation) Tomasz Trawicki
- (Portuguese Basketball Federation) Sérgio Silva
- (Basketball Federation of Serbia) Ilija Belošević
- (Basketball Federation of Serbia) Marko Juras
- (Basketball Federation of Serbia) Milivoje Jovčić
- (Basketball Federation of Serbia) Stefan Ćalić
- (Basketball Federation of Serbia) Uroš Nikolić
- (Basketball Federation of Serbia) Uroš Obrknežević
- (Basketball Federation of Slovenia) Damir Javor
- (Basketball Federation of Slovenia) Mario Majkić
- (Basketball Federation of Slovenia) Milan Nedović
- (Basketball Federation of Slovenia) Saša Pukl
- (Basketball Federation of Slovenia) Sašo Petek
- (Spanish Basketball Federation) Alberto Baena
- (Spanish Basketball Federation) Carlos Cortés
- (Spanish Basketball Federation) Carlos Peruga
- (Spanish Basketball Federation) Emilio Pérez
- (Spanish Basketball Federation) Jordi Aliaga
- (Spanish Basketball Federation) Juan Carlos García
- (Spanish Basketball Federation) Miguel Ángel Pérez
- (Spanish Basketball Federation) Sergio Manuel
- (Swedish Basketball Federation) Saulius Račys
- (Turkish Basketball Federation) Emin Moğulkoç
- (Turkish Basketball Federation) Hüseyin Çelik
- (Basketball Federation of Ukraine) Borys Ryzhyk

== Regular season ==
The regular season began on 3 October 2024 and concluded on 11 April 2025. The 18 teams will play against each other home-and-away in a round-robin format over 34 rounds where only 10 teams will advance to the postseason. Moreover, the top six teams from regular season will receive a bye to the playoffs, while the teams placed from seventh to 10th will participate in the play-in to get the last two playoff spots. At the tail end of the standings, teams placed from 11th to 18th will be eliminated after the regular season.

=== League table ===
Pos	Team	Pld	W	L	PF	PA	PD	Qualification
1	(Hellenic Basketball Federation) Olympiacos	34	24	10	2941	2770	+171	Qualification to playoffs
2	(Turkish Basketball Federation) Fenerbahçe Beko	34	23	11	2829	2760	+69	Qualification to playoffs
3	(Hellenic Basketball Federation) Panathinaikos AKTOR	34	22	12	2990	2843	+147	Qualification to playoffs
4	(French Federation of Basketball) Monaco	34	21	13	2913	2801	+112	Qualification to playoffs
5	(Spanish Basketball Federation) Barcelona	34	20	14	2966	2837	+129	Qualification to playoffs
6	(Turkish Basketball Federation) Anadolu Efes	34	20	14	2941	2788	+153	Qualification to playoffs
7	(Spanish Basketball Federation) Real Madrid	34	20	14	2870	2797	+73	Qualification to play-in
8	(French Federation of Basketball) Paris Basketball	34	19	15	2940	2910	+30	Qualification to play-in
9	(German Basketball Federation) Bayern Munich	34	19	15	2965	2984	−19	Qualification to play-in
10	(Basketball Federation of Serbia) Crvena zvezda Meridianbet	34	18	16	2776	2714	+62	Qualification to play-in
11	(Italian Basketball Federation) EA7 Emporio Armani Milan	34	17	17	2896	2934	−38	
12	(Basketball Federation of Serbia) Partizan Mozzart Bet	34	16	18	2780	2724	+56	
13	(Lithuanian Basketball Federation) Žalgiris	34	15	19	2626	2669	−43	
14	(Spanish Basketball Federation) Baskonia	34	14	20	2795	2830	−35	
15	(French Federation of Basketball) LDLC ASVEL	34	13	21	2740	2897	−157	
16	(Israeli Basketball Association) Maccabi Playtika Tel Aviv	34	11	23	2921	3052	−131	
17	(Italian Basketball Federation) Virtus Segafredo Bologna	34	9	25	2683	2834	−151	
18	(German Basketball Federation) ALBA Berlin	34	5	29	2646	3074	−428	

Source: EuroLeague
Rules for classification: Regular season tiebreakers

=== Results ===
Home \ Away	BER	EFS	FCB	BKN	BAY	CZV	MIL	FBB	ASV	MTA	ASM	OLY	PAO	PBB	PAR	RMB	VIR	ZAL
ALBA Berlin (German Basketball Federation)	—	70–86	85–99	97–90	84–99	71–77	105–101	71–78	84–79	85–103	90–105	92–100	77–87	83–92	90–91	69–80	64–108	66–86
Anadolu Efes (Turkish Basketball Federation)	98–73	—	88–97	92–76	101–90	89–67	110–66	78–83	76–82	90–88	69–81	91–89	93–67	84–93	86–77	79–73	89–68	87–77
Barcelona (Spanish Basketball Federation)	88–73	90–80	—	91–68	101–102	74–78	81–94	90–63	90–83	100–71	86–71	88–90	82–73	87–103	87–80	90–97	91–87	82–70
Baskonia (Spanish Basketball Federation)	80–57	84–89	88–86	—	112–89	73–75	88–83	88–76	111–75	89–82	75–87	101–102	91–77	94–81	88–82	76–72	81–82	66–65
Bayern Munich (German Basketball Federation)	115–86	92–97	100–78	94–80	—	100–82	87–70	77–89	76–67	98–93	95–94	84–80	69–80	109–107	89–74	97–89	72–82	77–74
Crvena zvezda Meridianbet (Basketball Federation of Serbia)	92–71	96–97	94–98	78–71	101–77	—	80–82	91–96	73–66	81–73	88–82	87–73	77–81	85–69	77–89	72–78	88–52	80–86
EA7 Emporio Armani Milan (Italian Basketball Federation)	100–68	84–96	88–98	111–89	78–79	101–86	—	76–100	92–84	98–86	86–80	83–84	87–75	79–74	70–90	85–76	99–90	82–85
Fenerbahçe Beko (Turkish Basketball Federation)	90–73	84–76	75–83	82–77	87–76	57–76	85–91	—	92–82	84–82	69–99	82–71	76–81	101–100	89–72	78–67	95–81	98–86
LDLC ASVEL (French Federation of Basketball)	96–89	97–82	100–94	76–69	71–84	77–74	66–75	73–77	—	95–102	78–83	81–70	93–96	98–93	62–93	80–78	87–85	88–79
Maccabi Playtika Tel Aviv (Israeli Basketball Association)	87–93	93–91	86–88	85–95	93–90	85–73	74–107	94–76	89–82	—	91–88	91–94	92–99	81–93	79–91	79–78	77–67	95–78
Monaco (French Federation of Basketball)	100–80	94–75	84–98	92–85	93–74	90–98	93–80	91–82	103–92	85–79	—	80–89	76–88	80–87	69–86	77–73	101–85	96–86
Olympiacos (Hellenic Basketball Federation)	90–85	92–89	95–74	92–69	112–69	73–81	89–68	77–87	94–92	99–93	77–80	—	76–74	90–96	82–70	79–69	87–77	74–68
Panathinaikos AKTOR (Hellenic Basketball Federation)	91–81	104–89	90–89	104–69	94–79	111–104	103–74	91–90	92–68	93–87	88–91	89–94	—	98–101	96–84	85–70	111–90	89–76
Paris Basketball (French Federation of Basketball)	72–63	88–84	79–90	67–65	93–88	77–80	92–79	83–87	91–82	96–83	79–91	73–90	84–80	—	74–71	85–96	81–78	83–77
Partizan Mozzart Bet (Basketball Federation of Serbia)	85–71	65–97	79–87	86–73	86–78	71–73	81–88	90–81	79–82	98–75	74–79	78–70	91–73	92–86	—	89–91	69–70	84–78
Real Madrid (Spanish Basketball Federation)	98–84	64–74	96–91	90–89	88–76	95–72	96–89	70–82	81–70	116–113	94–72	86–96	90–86	105–104	93–86	—	98–86	83–92
Virtus Segafredo Bologna (Italian Basketball Federation)	88–90	67–76	86–81	76–74	84–87	87–94	90–70	82–86	83–69	84–77	80–86	70–92	77–82	77–83	71–81	67–80	—	68–71
Žalgiris (Lithuanian Basketball Federation)	73–53	85–72	74–67	70–83	82–97	86–84	87–89	65–72	72–78	78–63	63–62	85–92	84–77	83–81	70–66	64–83	77–68	—

Source: EuroLeague
Legend: Blue = home team win; Red = away team win.
Matches with lighter background shading were decided after overtime.

== Play-in ==
Under the new format, the 7th to 10th-ranked teams faced each other in the play-in. Each game is hosted by the team with the higher regular season record. The format was similar to the first two rounds of the Page–McIntyre system for a four-team playoff that was identical to that of the NBA play-in tournament. First, the 7th seed will host the 8th seed, with the winner advancing to the playoffs as the 7th seed; likewise the 9th seed will host the 10th seed, with the loser eliminated. Then the loser of the 7-v-8 game will host the winner of the 9-v-10 game, with the winner of that game getting the final playoff spot, as the 8th seed.

Round 1
Play-In A
7	(Spanish Basketball Federation) Real Madrid	73
8	(French Federation of Basketball) Paris Basketball	81
Play-In B
9	(German Basketball Federation) Bayern Munich	97
10	(Basketball Federation of Serbia) Crvena zvezda Meridianbet	93

Round 2
Play-In C
7	(Spanish Basketball Federation) Real Madrid	93
9	(German Basketball Federation) Bayern Munich	71

== Playoffs ==
Playoffs series are best-of-five. The first team to win three games wins the series. A 2–2–1 format is used – teams with home-court advantage play games 1, 2, and 5 at home, while their opponents host games 3 and 4. Games 4 and 5 are only played if necessary. The four winning teams advance to the Final Four.

=== Series ===
Team 1	Series	Team 2	Game 1	Game 2	Game 3	Game 4	Game 5
Olympiacos (Hellenic Basketball Federation)	3–1	(Spanish Basketball Federation) Real Madrid	84–72	77–71	72–80	86–84	—
Fenerbahçe Beko (Turkish Basketball Federation)	3–0	(French Federation of Basketball) Paris Basketball	83–78	89–72	98–88	—	—
Panathinaikos AKTOR (Hellenic Basketball Federation)	3–2	(Turkish Basketball Federation) Anadolu Efes	87–83	76–79	81–77	82–85	75–67
Monaco (French Federation of Basketball)	3–2	(Spanish Basketball Federation) Barcelona	97–80	92–79	89–100	72–79	85–84

== Final Four ==
The Final Four was hosted by the Etihad Arena in Abu Dhabi, UAE, as announced by EuroLeague Basketball on 28 January 2025. Abu Dhabi became the first non-Israeli city outside of Europe, to host the Final Four in league's history.

Semifinals
23 May
(Hellenic Basketball Federation) Olympiacos	68
(French Federation of Basketball) Monaco	78
23 May
(Turkish Basketball Federation) Fenerbahçe Beko	82
(Hellenic Basketball Federation) Panathinaikos AKTOR	76

Championship game
25 May
(French Federation of Basketball) Monaco	70
(Turkish Basketball Federation) Fenerbahçe Beko	81
Third place game
25 May
(Hellenic Basketball Federation) Olympiacos	97
(Hellenic Basketball Federation) Panathinaikos AKTOR	93

== Awards ==
All official awards of the 2024–25 EuroLeague.

=== EuroLeague MVP ===
- (United States) Kendrick Nunn ( (Greece) Panathinaikos AKTOR)

=== EuroLeague Final Four MVP ===
- (United States) Nigel Hayes-Davis ( (Turkey) Fenerbahçe Beko)

=== All-EuroLeague Teams ===
Pos.	First Team		Second Team	
G	(North Macedonia) T. J. Shorts	(France) Paris Basketball	(United States) Mike James	(France) Monaco
G	(United States) Carsen Edwards	(Germany) Bayern Munich	(France) Théo Maledon	(France) LDLC ASVEL
F	(United States) Kendrick Nunn	(Greece) Panathinaikos AKTOR	(France) Evan Fournier	(Greece) Olympiacos
F	(Bulgaria) Sasha Vezenkov	(Greece) Olympiacos	(Spain) Juancho Hernangómez	(Greece) Panathinaikos AKTOR
C	(United States) Nigel Hayes-Davis	(Turkey) Fenerbahçe Beko	(Cape Verde) Edy Tavares	(Spain) Real Madrid

=== EuroLeague Playoffs MVP ===
- (Bulgaria) Sasha Vezenkov ( (Greece) Olympiacos)

=== Alphonso Ford Top Scorer Trophy ===
- (United States) Kendrick Nunn ( (Greece) Panathinaikos AKTOR)

=== Best Defender ===
- (Germany) Nick Weiler-Babb ( (Germany) Bayern Munich)

=== Rising Star ===
- (France) Nadir Hifi ( (France) Paris Basketball)

=== Coach of the Year ===
- (Lithuania) Šarūnas Jasikevičius ( (Turkey) Fenerbahçe Beko)

=== Play-in MVP ===
- (North Macedonia) T. J. Shorts ( (France) Paris Basketball)

=== MVP of the Round ===
Regular season

Round	Player	Team	PIR	Ref.
1	(Israel) Tamir Blatt	(Israeli Basketball Association) Maccabi Playtika Tel Aviv	36	
2	(France) Neal Sako	(French Federation of Basketball) LDLC ASVEL	30	
2	(Bulgaria) Sasha Vezenkov	(Hellenic Basketball Federation) Olympiacos	30	
3	(Bulgaria) Sasha Vezenkov (2)	(Hellenic Basketball Federation) Olympiacos	31	
4	(France) Théo Maledon	(French Federation of Basketball) LDLC ASVEL	36	
5	(North Macedonia) T. J. Shorts	(French Federation of Basketball) Paris Basketball	38	
6	(Puerto Rico) Shabazz Napier	(German Basketball Federation) Bayern Munich	26	
7	(Azerbaijan) Zach LeDay	(Italian Basketball Federation) EA7 Emporio Armani Milan	29	
8	(Czech Republic) Jan Veselý	(Spanish Basketball Federation) Barcelona	28	
9	(Serbia) Filip Petrušev	(Basketball Federation of Serbia) Crvena zvezda Meridianbet	38	
10	(France) Théo Maledon (2)	(French Federation of Basketball) LDLC ASVEL	36	
10	(North Macedonia) T. J. Shorts (2)	(French Federation of Basketball) Paris Basketball	36	
11	(France) Élie Okobo	(French Federation of Basketball) Monaco	36	
12	(Cape Verde) Edy Tavares	(Spanish Basketball Federation) Real Madrid	39	
13	(France) Théo Maledon (3)	(French Federation of Basketball) LDLC ASVEL	31	
14	(United States) Nigel Hayes-Davis	(Turkish Basketball Federation) Fenerbahçe Beko	30	
15	(Azerbaijan) Zach LeDay (2)	(Italian Basketball Federation) EA7 Emporio Armani Milan	37	
16	(Bulgaria) Sasha Vezenkov (3)	(Hellenic Basketball Federation) Olympiacos	38	
17	(France) Isaïa Cordinier	(Italian Basketball Federation) Virtus Segafredo Bologna	38	
18	(France) Jaylen Hoard	(Israeli Basketball Association) Maccabi Playtika Tel Aviv	34	
19	(Turkey) Ömer Yurtseven	(Hellenic Basketball Federation) Panathinaikos AKTOR	34	
20	(Bulgaria) Sasha Vezenkov (4)	(Hellenic Basketball Federation) Olympiacos	52	
21	(Argentina) Facundo Campazzo	(Spanish Basketball Federation) Real Madrid	43	
22	(South Sudan) Carlik Jones	(Basketball Federation of Serbia) Partizan Mozzart Bet	37	
23	(United States) Carsen Edwards	(German Basketball Federation) Bayern Munich	34	
24	(Azerbaijan) Zach LeDay (3)	(Italian Basketball Federation) EA7 Emporio Armani Milan	39	
25	(Bulgaria) Sasha Vezenkov (5)	(Hellenic Basketball Federation) Olympiacos	30	
26	(United States) Kendrick Nunn	(Hellenic Basketball Federation) Panathinaikos AKTOR	37	
27	(South Sudan) Carlik Jones (2)	(Basketball Federation of Serbia) Partizan Mozzart Bet	31	
27	(France) Sylvain Francisco	(Lithuanian Basketball Federation) Žalgiris	31	
28	(United States) Carsen Edwards (2)	(German Basketball Federation) Bayern Munich	29	
28	(France) Vincent Poirier	(Turkish Basketball Federation) Anadolu Efes	29	
29	(Turkey) Shane Larkin	(Turkish Basketball Federation) Anadolu Efes	33	
30	(North Macedonia) T. J. Shorts (3)	(French Federation of Basketball) Paris Basketball	37	
31	(United States) Kendrick Nunn (2)	(Hellenic Basketball Federation) Panathinaikos AKTOR	34	
32	(North Macedonia) T. J. Shorts (4)	(French Federation of Basketball) Paris Basketball	36	
33	(United States) Kendrick Nunn (3)	(Hellenic Basketball Federation) Panathinaikos AKTOR	43	
34	(Spain) Nikola Mirotić	(Italian Basketball Federation) EA7 Emporio Armani Milan	40	

Play-in

Round	Player	Team	PIR	Ref.
Play-in	(North Macedonia) T. J. Shorts (5)	(French Federation of Basketball) Paris Basketball	27	

Playoffs

Round	Player	Team	PIR	Ref.
1	(Spain) Juancho Hernangómez	(Hellenic Basketball Federation) Panathinaikos AKTOR	40	
2	(France) Mam Jaiteh	(French Federation of Basketball) Monaco	27	
2	(Turkey) Shane Larkin (2)	(Turkish Basketball Federation) Anadolu Efes	27	
3	(Spain) Willy Hernangómez	(Spanish Basketball Federation) Barcelona	31	
3	(United States) Kendrick Nunn (4)	(Hellenic Basketball Federation) Panathinaikos AKTOR	31	
4	(France) Evan Fournier	(Hellenic Basketball Federation) Olympiacos	18	
5	(Turkey) Cedi Osman	(Hellenic Basketball Federation) Panathinaikos AKTOR	32	

=== MVP of the Month ===
Month	Round	Player	Team	Ref.
2024
October	1–7	(United States) Kevin Punter	(Spain) Barcelona	
November	8–12	(North Macedonia) T. J. Shorts	(France) Paris Basketball	
December	13–18	(France) Théo Maledon	(France) LDLC ASVEL	
2025
January	19–24	(Bulgaria) Sasha Vezenkov	(Greece) Olympiacos	
February	25–27	(United States) Kendrick Nunn	(Greece) Panathinaikos AKTOR	
March/April	28–34	(Cape Verde) Edy Tavares	(Spain) Real Madrid	

== Statistics ==
=== Individual statistics ===
==== Rating ====
Rank	Name	Team	Games	Rating	PIR
1.	(Bulgaria) Sasha Vezenkov	(Greece) Olympiacos	38	902	23.7
2.	(North Macedonia) T. J. Shorts	(France) Paris Basketball	37	842	22.8
3.	(Spain) Nikola Mirotić	(Italy) EA7 Emporio Armani Milan	30	659	22.0

==== Points ====
Rank	Name	Team	Games	Points	PPG
1.	(United States) Carsen Edwards (Top Scorer)	(Germany) FC Bayern Munich	35	713	20.4
1.	(United States) Kendrick Nunn (Alphonso Ford Top Scorer Trophy)	(Greece) Panathinaikos AKTOR	40	802	20.0
2.	(Bulgaria) Sasha Vezenkov	(Greece) Olympiacos	38	751	19.8

==== Rebounds ====
Rank	Name	Team	Games	Rebounds	RPG
1.	(Spain) Juancho Hernangómez	(Greece) Panathinaikos AKTOR	40	278	7.0
2.	(Bulgaria) Sasha Vezenkov	(Greece) Olympiacos	38	250	6.6
2.	(Cape Verde) Edy Tavares	(Spain) Real Madrid	40	263	6.6

==== Assists ====
Rank	Name	Team	Games	Assists	APG
1.	(North Macedonia) T. J. Shorts	(France) Paris Basketball	37	271	7.3
2.	(Israel) Tamir Blatt	(Israel) Maccabi Playtika Tel Aviv	26	175	6.7
3.	(Argentina) Facundo Campazzo	(Spain) Real Madrid	39	234	6.0

== Attendances ==
Pos	Team	Total	High	Low	Average	Change
1	(Basketball Federation of Serbia) Partizan Mozzart Bet	315,359	20,111	7,494	18,551	−6.9%
2	(Basketball Federation of Serbia) Crvena zvezda Meridianbet	310,066	20,999	7,467	18,239	+2.2%
3	(Hellenic Basketball Federation) Panathinaikos AKTOR	349,273	18,940	12,455	17,464	+14.2%
4	(Lithuanian Basketball Federation) Žalgiris	252,826	15,325	14,357	14,872	+0.7%
5	(Hellenic Basketball Federation) Olympiacos	220,987	12,349	9,737	11,631	+0.8%
6	(Turkish Basketball Federation) Fenerbahçe Beko	196,750	12,920	7,998	10,931	+4.5%
7	(German Basketball Federation) Bayern Munich	196,159	11,200	10,088	10,898	+75.3%
8	Final Four in Abu Dhabi	20,436	10,218	10,218	10,218	−24.7%
9	(Turkish Basketball Federation) Anadolu Efes	172,154	10,000	6,688	9,564	−25.0%
10	(Spanish Basketball Federation) Baskonia	161,190	14,204	7,155	9,482	−4.9%
11	(Spanish Basketball Federation) Real Madrid	193,955	12,130	7,123	9,236	+3.6%
12	(German Basketball Federation) ALBA Berlin	156,064	13,591	4,897	9,180	−2.4%
13	(Italian Basketball Federation) EA7 Emporio Armani Milan	155,678	12,486	7,315	9,158	−8.9%
14	(Italian Basketball Federation) Virtus Segafredo Bologna	132,588	9,071	6,104	7,799	−2.9%
15	(French Federation of Basketball) Paris Basketball	137,182	15,356	3,359	7,621	n/a^{1}
16	(French Federation of Basketball) LDLC ASVEL	125,257	11,782	4,974	7,368	−2.6%
17	(Spanish Basketball Federation) Barcelona	118,598	7,572	5,297	6,242	−3.1%
18	(French Federation of Basketball) Monaco	81,413	5,000	2,432	4,071	+0.5%
19	(Israeli Basketball Association) Maccabi Playtika Tel Aviv	3,204	650	0	178	−72.5%
	League total	3,290,107	20,999	1,416	10,648	+1.1%

Source: EuroLeague
Notes:
1: Team did not participate in the last EuroLeague regular season.

1. Maccabi Playtika Tel Aviv played their home games at Aleksandar Nikolic Hall in Serbia's capital, Belgrade, due to security concerns derived from the ongoing Gaza war.
2. Fenerbahçe Beko game against Maccabi Playtika Tel Aviv was relocated to Žalgiris Arena in Kaunas, Lithuania due to security concerns. Game attendance is not included in league total.
3. Crvena zvezda Meridianbet and Partizan Mozzart Bet played two and one game respectively at Aleksandar Nikolić Hall due to availability reasons of Belgrade Arena.
4. Anadolu Efes game against Maccabi Playtika Tel Aviv was relocated to Xiaomi Arena in Riga, Latvia due to security concerns. Game attendance is not included in league total.

== See also ==
- 2024–25 EuroCup Basketball
- 2024–25 Basketball Champions League
- 2024–25 FIBA Europe Cup
