= Juancho Hernangómez =

Spanish basketball player (born 1995)

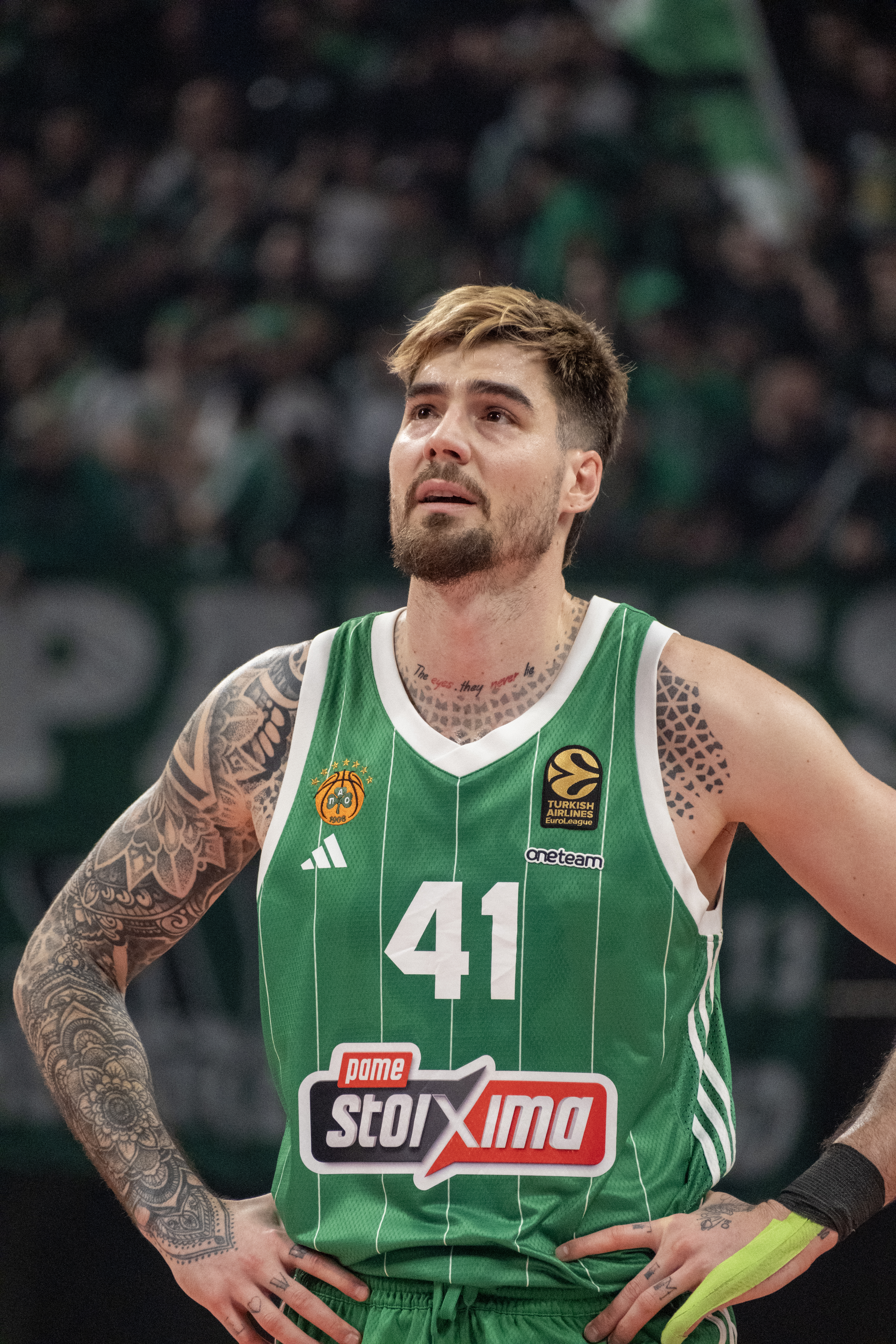
- Hernangómez with Panathinaikos in 2025

No. 41 – Panathinaikos
- Position: Power forward
- League: GBL; EuroLeague

Personal information
- Born: 28 September 1995 (age 31) Madrid, Spain
- Listed height: 6 ft 9 in (2.06 m)
- Listed weight: 216 lb (98 kg)

Career information
- NBA draft: 2016: 1st round, 15th overall pick
- Drafted by: Denver Nuggets
- Playing career: 2014–present

Career history
- 2014–2016: Estudiantes
- 2016–2020: Denver Nuggets
- 2017: →Sioux Falls Skyforce
- 2020–2021: Minnesota Timberwolves
- 2021–2022: Boston Celtics
- 2022: San Antonio Spurs
- 2022: Utah Jazz
- 2022–2023: Toronto Raptors
- 2023–present: Panathinaikos

Career highlights
- EuroLeague champion (2024); All-EuroLeague Second Team (2025); EuroLeague rebounding leader (2025); Greek League champion (2024); 2x Greek Cup winner (2025, 2026); All-Greek League Team (2025); Liga ACB Best Young Player (2016)
- Stats at NBA.com
- Stats at Basketball Reference
Medals
Men's basketball
Representing Spain
World Cup
| Gold medal – first place | 2019 China |
EuroBasket
| Gold medal – first place | 2022 Czech Republic–Georgia–Italy–Germany |
| Bronze medal – third place | 2017 Finland–Israel–Romania–Turkey |
European U-20 Championship
| Silver medal – second place | 2015 Italy | Team |
| Silver medal – second place | 2014 Greece | Team |
European U-18 Championship
| Bronze medal – third place | 2013 Latvia | Team |

Juan Alberto "Juancho" Hernangómez Geuer (born 28 September 1995) is a Spanish professional basketball player for Panathinaikos of the Greek Basketball League (GBL) and the EuroLeague. He was selected by the Denver Nuggets with the 15th overall pick in the 2016 NBA draft and spent seven seasons in the NBA before returning to Europe. He is an All-EuroLeague Second Team selection and won the EuroLeague in 2024.

Hernangómez represents the senior Spanish national team in international competition. He won the 2019 FIBA Basketball World Cup and played a crucial part in winning the EuroBasket 2022, scoring a game-high 27 points in the final against France. Additionally to his playing career, Hernangómez co-starred in the Netflix basketball film Hustle in 2022, alongside Adam Sandler.

== Early career ==
Hernangómez began playing competitive basketball in 2007, with the youth teams of CB Las Rozas. He joined a youth squad of Real Madrid and played with the team until moving to Club Baloncesto Majadahonda for the following years.

== Professional career ==
=== CB Estudiantes (2012–2016) ===
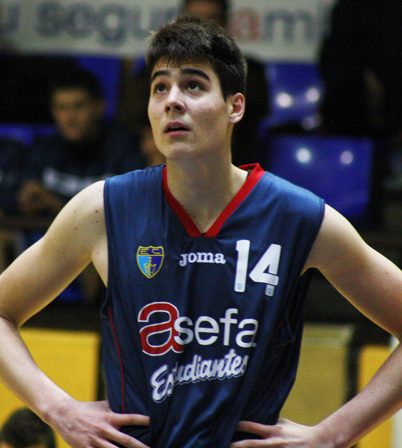
Hernangómez with Estudiantes in 2013

In 2012 Hernangómez signed his first professional contract with CB Estudiantes and played with the club's reserve side until 2014, when he was promoted to the first team. In the 2015–16 ACB season Hernangómez averaged 9.7 points and 5.7 rebounds across 34 games and was named the ACB Best Young Player.

=== Denver Nuggets (2016–2020) ===
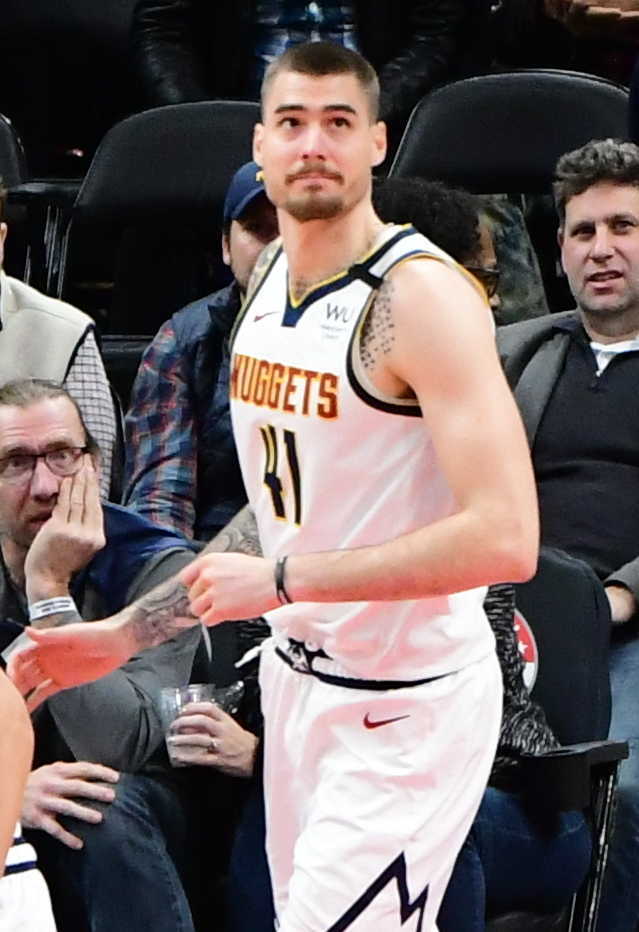
Hernangómez with the Denver Nuggets in 2020

On 26 April 2016, Hernangómez was named in the international early entry candidates list for the 2016 NBA draft. He was selected by the Denver Nuggets with the 15th overall pick. On 9 August 2016, he signed his rookie scale contract with the Nuggets. On 4 January 2017, he was assigned to the Sioux Falls Skyforce of the NBA Development League, pursuant to the flexible assignment rule. He was recalled by the Nuggets three days later after appearing in one game for the Skyforce. On 13 February 2017, he scored a season-high 27 points to go with a season-best 10 rebounds in a 132–110 win over the Golden State Warriors. He hit six three-pointers against the Warriors to help the Nuggets tie an NBA record with 24 three-pointers. Early in the 2017–18 season, Hernangomez was diagnosed with mononucleosis, and as a result, he played in only 25 games during his sophomore campaign.

=== Minnesota Timberwolves (2020–2021) ===
On 5 February 2020, Hernangómez was traded to the Minnesota Timberwolves.

He re-signed with the Timberwolves on a three-year deal on 27 November 2020. The 2020–21 season was a tumultuous one for Hernangómez as he showed up to training camp out of shape, contracted COVID-19, and lost his spot in the starting lineup, capped off by a falling out with the Timberwolves front office over their decision to disallow him from participating in the 2021 Olympics after suffering a shoulder injury during an exhibition game.

=== Boston Celtics (2021–2022) ===
On 25 August 2021, Hernangómez and Jarrett Culver were traded to the Memphis Grizzlies in exchange for Patrick Beverley and on 15 September, he was traded to the Boston Celtics in exchange for Kris Dunn, Carsen Edwards and the right for a 2026 second-round pick swap.

=== San Antonio Spurs (2022) ===
On 19 January 2022, Hernangómez was traded to the San Antonio Spurs in a three-team trade involving the Denver Nuggets, sending Bol Bol and PJ Dozier to Boston and Bryn Forbes to Denver.

=== Utah Jazz (2022) ===
On 9 February 2022, Hernangómez was traded to the Utah Jazz in a three-team trade. On 30 June, he was waived by the Jazz.

=== Toronto Raptors (2022–2023) ===
On 27 July 2022, Hernangómez signed a one-year contract with the Toronto Raptors for an amount equal to the veteran's minimum.

During the 2022–23 season, he found himself out of the team's rotation and was a healthy scratch in several games. On 28 February 2023, the Raptors waived Hernangómez to make room for guard Will Barton.

Reflecting on his time with the Raptors, Hernangómez expressed surprise at being waived, noting, "It surprised me when they waived me because I was really good in the locker room, good teammate and working hard every single day."

=== Panathinaikos (2023–present) ===
On 27 July 2023, Hernangómez signed a two-year, 4,500,000€ deal with EuroLeague powerhouse Panathinaikos, returning to European basketball after seven years.

On 19 July 2023, Hernangómez signed a two–year contract with Greek club Panathinaikos.

His first season in Athens was considered underwhelming, with head coach Ergin Ataman publicly critical of his performances. However, Hernangómez found improved form in his second year, becoming an important part of the team’s rotation.

On January 3, 2025, Panathinaikos announced that Hernangómez had extended his contract until 2027.

Hernangómez’s standout moment came during the 2025 EuroLeague Playoffs, when he was named MVP of Game 1 against Anadolu Efes after a dominant all-around performance. His performances throughout the season earned him a place in the All-EuroLeague Second Team. Spanish daily AS described him as having finally "let loose" in the Panathinaikos jersey after a difficult start.

== National team career ==
=== Junior national team ===
In 2013, Hernangómez competed with the Spain national under-18 basketball team at the FIBA Europe Under-18 Championship in Latvia. He joined the under-20 team for the following two years, playing at the FIBA Europe Under-20 Championship. Hernangómez also helped the senior Spain national team practice for the EuroBasket 2015.

=== Senior national team ===
His senior Spain national team major tournament debut was at the EuroBasket 2017. Hernangomez averaged 8.4 points, 5.9 rebounds, 0.7 assists and 0.7 blocked shots in 19.7 minutes per game. Spain finished in third place, winning the bronze medal.

In June 2018, Hernangomez was again named to the Spain national team's roster in advance of the first stage of qualifiers for the 2019 FIBA World Cup.

Hernangómez and Spain won a surprising gold medal at EuroBasket 2022. In the final against France, Hernangómez scored 27 points including seven three-pointers to guide Spain to a convincing win. He was third on the team in scoring (12.8 points per game) and third in rebounding as well (5.0 per game). His brother Willy was also on the team and won tournament MVP honours.

== Career statistics ==
Legend
| GP | Games played | GS | Games started | MPG | Minutes per game |
| FG% | Field-goal percentage | 3P% | 3-point field-goal percentage | FT% | Free-throw percentage |
| RPG | Rebounds per game | APG | Assists per game | SPG | Steals per game |
| BPG | Blocks per game | PPG | Points per game | PIR | Performance index rating |
| **Bold** | Career high |

=== NBA ===
==== Regular season ====
| Year | Team | GP | GS | MPG | FG% | 3P% | FT% | RPG | APG | SPG | BPG | PPG |
|---|---|---|---|---|---|---|---|---|---|---|---|---|
| 2016–17 | Denver | 62 | 9 | 13.6 | .451 | .407 | .750 | 3.0 | .5 | .5 | .2 | 4.9 |
| 2017–18 | Denver | 25 | 3 | 11.1 | .387 | .280 | **.833** | 2.2 | .5 | .2 | .1 | 3.3 |
| 2018–19 | Denver | **70** | **25** | 19.4 | .439 | .365 | .767 | 3.8 | .8 | .4 | .3 | 5.8 |
| 2019–20 | Denver | 34 | 0 | 12.4 | .345 | .250 | .640 | 2.8 | .6 | .1 | .1 | 3.1 |
| 2019–20 | Minnesota | 14 | 14 | **29.4** | .453 | .420 | .609 | **7.3** | **1.3** | **1.0** | .3 | **12.9** |
| 2020–21 | Minnesota | 52 | 6 | 17.3 | .435 | .327 | .619 | 3.9 | .7 | .4 | .1 | 7.2 |
| 2021–22 | Boston | 18 | 0 | 5.3 | .185 | .167 | .667 | 1.4 | .2 | .2 | .1 | 1.1 |
| 2021–22 | San Antonio | 5 | 0 | 10.2 | .333 | .000 | .750 | 3.0 | .6 | .2 | .2 | 1.4 |
| 2021–22 | Utah | 17 | 9 | 17.5 | **.507** | **.438** | .476 | 3.5 | .8 | .4 | **.5** | 6.2 |
| 2022–23 | Toronto | 42 | 10 | 14.6 | .421 | .254 | .563 | 2.9 | .6 | .4 | .1 | 2.9 |
| Career | | 339 | 76 | 15.5 | .428 | .342 | .676 | 3.3 | .6 | .4 | .2 | 5.0 |

==== Playoffs ====
| Year | Team | GP | GS | MPG | FG% | 3P% | FT% | RPG | APG | SPG | BPG | PPG |
|---|---|---|---|---|---|---|---|---|---|---|---|---|
| 2019 | Denver | 5 | 0 | 2.9 | **.333** | **.500** | — | .6 | — | — | — | 0.6 |
| 2022 | Utah | **6** | 0 | **9.3** | .278 | .333 | — | **2.0** | **.8** | **.3** | — | **2.3** |
| Career | | 11 | 0 | 6.5 | .286 | .357 | — | 1.4 | .5 | .2 | — | 1.5 |

=== EuroLeague ===
| † | Denotes seasons in which Hernangómez won the EuroLeague |
| * | Led the league |

| Year | Team | GP | GS | MPG | FG% | 3P% | FT% | RPG | APG | SPG | BPG | PPG | PIR |
|---|---|---|---|---|---|---|---|---|---|---|---|---|---|
| 2023–24† | Panathinaikos | 31 | 7 | 16.4 | .356 | .264 | **.756** | 3.5 | .5 | .6 | .3 | 4.3 | 5.8 |
| 2024–25 | Panathinaikos | 40 | **27** | **27.2** | **.501** | **.430** | .631 | **7.0*** | **1.4** | **.9** | .3 | **10.0** | **15.3** |
| 2025–26 | Panathinaikos | **44** | 26 | 25.4 | .490 | .362 | .750 | 6.5 | .7 | .8 | .3 | 8.0 | 12.3 |
| Career | | 115 | 60 | 22.3 | .471 | .369 | .701 | 5.9 | .9 | .8 | .3 | 7.7 | 11.6 |

=== Domestic leagues ===
| Year | Team | League | GP | MPG | FG% | 3P% | FT% | RPG | APG | SPG | BPG | PPG |
|---|---|---|---|---|---|---|---|---|---|---|---|---|
| 2013–14 | (Spain) Estudiantes | ACB | 4 | 3.4 | .333 | **.500** | — | .5 | — | .2 | .2 | 0.7 |
| 2014–15 | (Spain) Estudiantes | ACB | 28 | 10.0 | .400 | .250 | **.737** | 2.2 | .3 | .2 | .3 | 2.4 |
| 2015–16 | (Spain) Estudiantes | ACB | 34 | 23.7 | .455 | .358 | .717 | 5.7 | .6 | .8 | .3 | 9.7 |
| 2016–17 | (United States) Sioux Falls Skyforce | D-League | 1 | **26.0** | .429 | .200 | .571 | **11.0** | 1.0 | — | **2.0** | **17.0** |
| 2023–24 | (Greece) Panathinaikos | GBL | **25** | 21.8 | .494 | .394 | .548 | 5.6 | 1.0 | .8 | .6 | 8.2 |
| 2024–25 | (Greece) Panathinaikos | GBL | **25** | 21.4 | **.521** | .379 | .666 | 6.0 | **1.2** | **1.0** | .4 | 9.6 |

== Player profile ==
Hernangómez's style of play has drawn comparisons to NBA players Víctor Claver and Jonas Jerebko. He has been praised for his speed, athleticism, and approximately 7 ft (2.13 m) wingspan. The duo of him and his brother, Willy, have also been compared to Spanish NBA stars Marc and Pau Gasol.

== Acting career ==
In 2022, Hernangómez made his acting debut in the Netflix sports drama film Hustle, produced by Adam Sandler’s Happy Madison Productions and LeBron James’ SpringHill Company.

He portrayed fictional Spanish prospect Bo Cruz, a gifted but troubled streetball player discovered by Sandler’s character, scout Stanley Sugerman. The film received positive reviews from critics, with Hernangómez’s performance being highlighted as natural and charismatic.

The role brought Hernangómez international recognition outside basketball, with media outlets noting his on-screen chemistry with Sandler and his convincing transition to acting.

== Family ==
Hernangómez's immediate family is made up of former or current basketball players. His older brother Willy currently plays for FC Barcelona, having previously played for the Pelicans, Hornets, Knicks, and Real Madrid. His mother Margarita Geuer Draeger was an international basketball player, winning a European championship with Spain in 1993. His father also played for Real Madrid and Estudiantes and his younger sister currently plays for Estudiantes' youth team.
