= Kendrick Nunn =

American basketball player (born 1995)

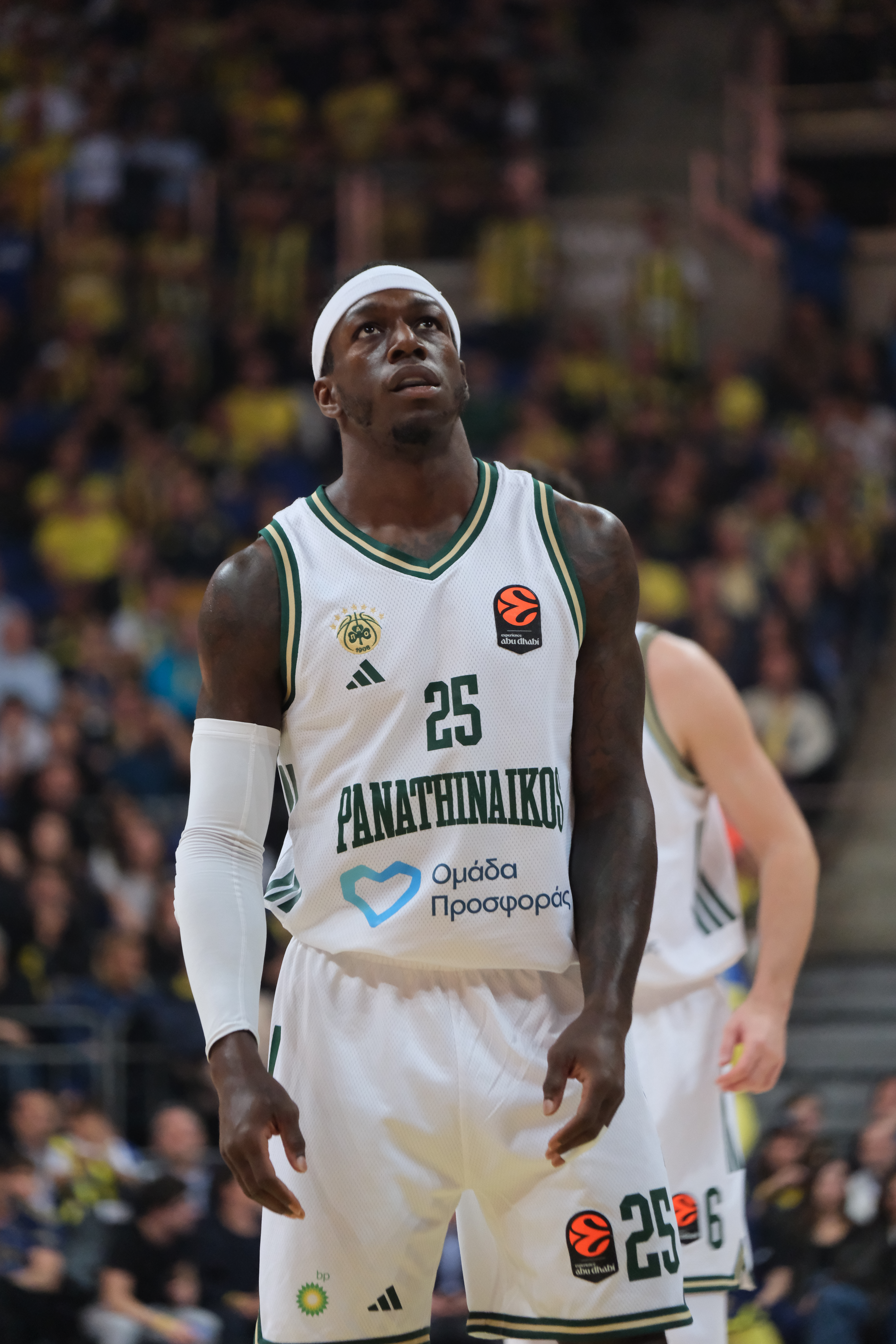
- Nunn with Panathinaikos in 2025

No. 25 – Panathinaikos
- Position: Shooting guard
- League: GBL; EuroLeague

Personal information
- Born: August 3, 1995 (age 31) Chicago, Illinois, U.S.
- Listed height: 1.95 m (6 ft 5 in)
- Listed weight: 190 lb (86 kg)

Career information
- High school: Simeon Career Academy (Chicago, Illinois)
- College: Illinois (2013–2016); Oakland (2017–2018)
- NBA draft: 2018: undrafted
- Playing career: 2018–present

Career history
- 2018–2019: Santa Cruz Warriors
- 2019–2021: Miami Heat
- 2021–2023: Los Angeles Lakers
- 2023: Washington Wizards
- 2023–present: Panathinaikos

Career highlights
- EuroLeague champion (2024); EuroLeague MVP (2025); 2× All-EuroLeague First Team (2024, 2025); All-EuroLeague Second Team (2026); Alphonso Ford EuroLeague Top Scorer Trophy (2025); EuroLeague Magic Moment (2025); NBA All-Rookie First Team (2020); Greek League champion (2024); 2x Greek Cup winner (2025, 2026); Greek League Finals MVP (2024); 2× All-Greek League Team (2024, 2025); Greek League Most Popular Player (2024); Greek League Most Spectacular Player (2025); Horizon League Player of the Year (2018); First-team All-Horizon League (2018); Big Ten All-Freshman team (2014)
- Stats at NBA.com
- Stats at Basketball Reference
Medals
Men's basketball
Representing the United States
FIBA Americas U16 Championship
Gold medal – first place	2011 Mexico	National team
FIBA World U17 Championship
Gold medal – first place	2012 Lithuania	National team

Kendrick Melvin Nunn (born August 3, 1995) is an American professional basketball player for Panathinaikos of the Greek Basketball League (GBL) and the EuroLeague.

Nunn played college basketball for three seasons at the University of Illinois, where he was named to the 2013–14 Big Ten All-Freshman team. He was dismissed from the Illini after the 2015–16 season, and had to sit out a season after transferring to Oakland University due to National Collegiate Athletic Association (NCAA) transfer rules. He won the 2018 Horizon League Player of the Year award at Oakland after leading the nation in three-point shots made per game.

After going undrafted in the 2018 NBA draft, Nunn spent the 2018–19 season with the Santa Cruz Warriors of the NBA G League. In April 2019, he signed with the Miami Heat and reached the 2020 NBA Finals. He was also named to the NBA All-Rookie First Team. In October 2023, Nunn signed with Panathinaikos and won the EuroLeague title in his first season in Europe, earning All-EuroLeague First Team honors in the process. Nunn won the Alphonso Ford EuroLeague Top Scorer Trophy for the 2025 season and was the first player from Panathinaikos in the new EuroLeague era to win this award. He was named EuroLeague MVP in 2025.

== High school career ==
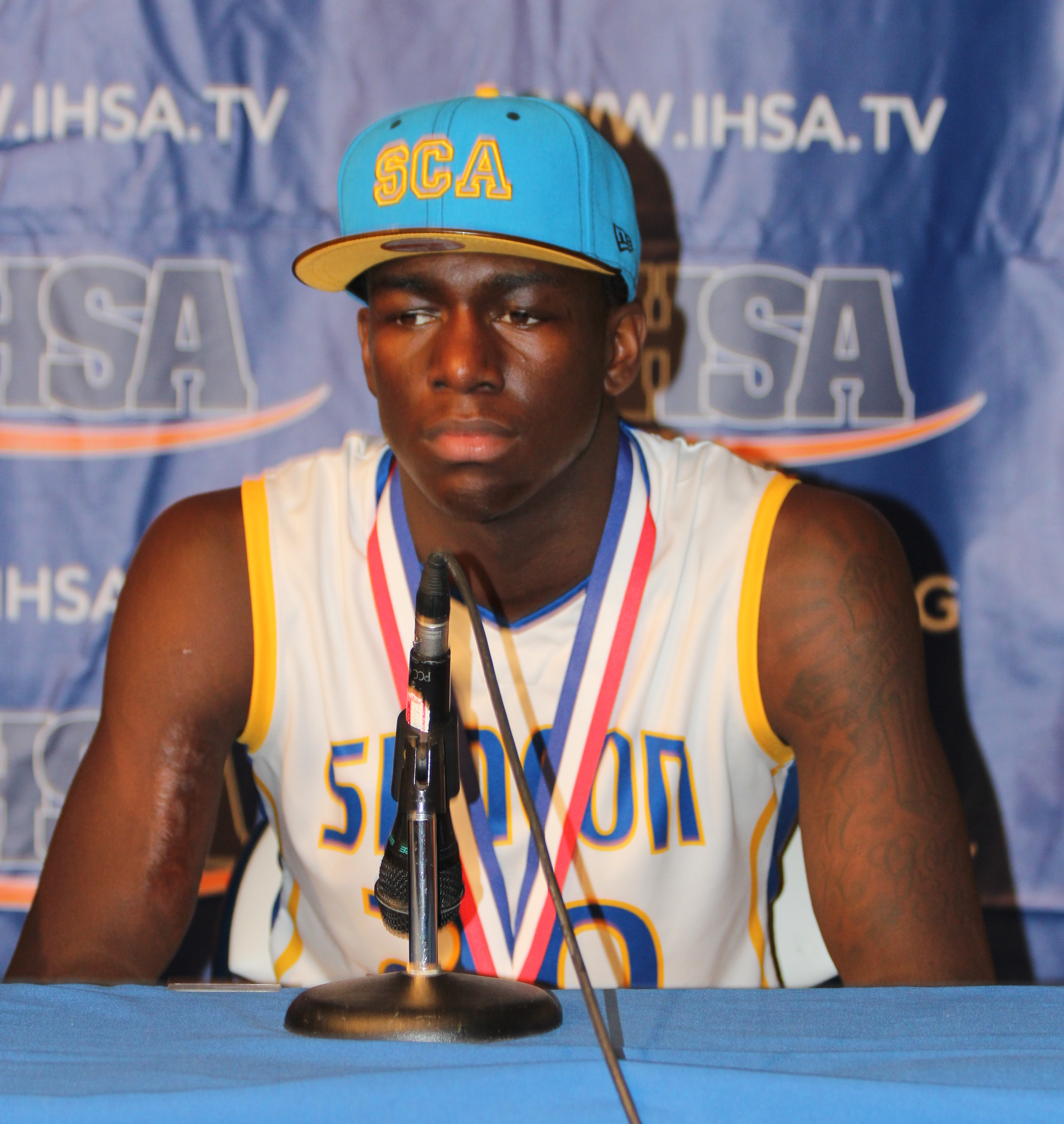
Nunn after winning the 2013 IHSA championship

Nunn attended Simeon Career Academy in Chicago. As a freshman, he received his first basketball scholarship offer from Rick Majerus, then the head coach at Saint Louis University. Nunn listed among the schools he was considering Illinois, Marquette, Memphis, Ohio State, Oklahoma State, Texas A&M, and UCLA.

During his senior season, Simeon honored his contribution by retiring his jersey, No. 20, along with that of fellow senior standout Jabari Parker, No. 22. Nunn and Parker joined Derrick Rose, Bobby Simmons, and Benji Wilson as the only Wolverine basketball players to have their jersey numbers retired. Nunn helped lead Simeon to four Illinois High School Association (IHSA) state titles.

Nunn verbally committed to Texas A&M before his junior year in August 2011, but about two months later he announced his de-commitment from that school and intent to reopen his recruiting process. His father, Melvin, explained that Kendrick felt he had committed prematurely and wished to explore all his options.

On September 15, 2012, after his official visit to Illinois, Nunn committed to play there under head coach John Groce.

College recruiting
Name	Hometown	School	Height	Weight	Commit date
Kendrick Nunn; SG	Chicago	Simeon (Illinois)	6 ft 3 in (1.91 m)	180 lb (82 kg)	Sep 15, 2012
Kendrick Nunn; SG	Recruit ratings: Scout: Rivals: 247Sports: (86)				
Overall recruit ranking: Scout: 59, 12 (SG) Rivals: 60, 18 (SG) ESPN: 61, 14 (SG)
Note: In many cases, Scout, Rivals, 247Sports, On3, and ESPN may conflict in their listings of height and weight.; In these cases, the average was taken. ESPN grades are on a 100-point scale.; Sources: "2013 Illinois Basketball Commitment List". Rivals.; "2013 Illinois Basketball Commitment List". Scout.; "2013 Illinois Basketball Commitment List". ESPN.; "Scout.com Team Recruiting Rankings". Scout.; "2013 Team Ranking". Rivals.

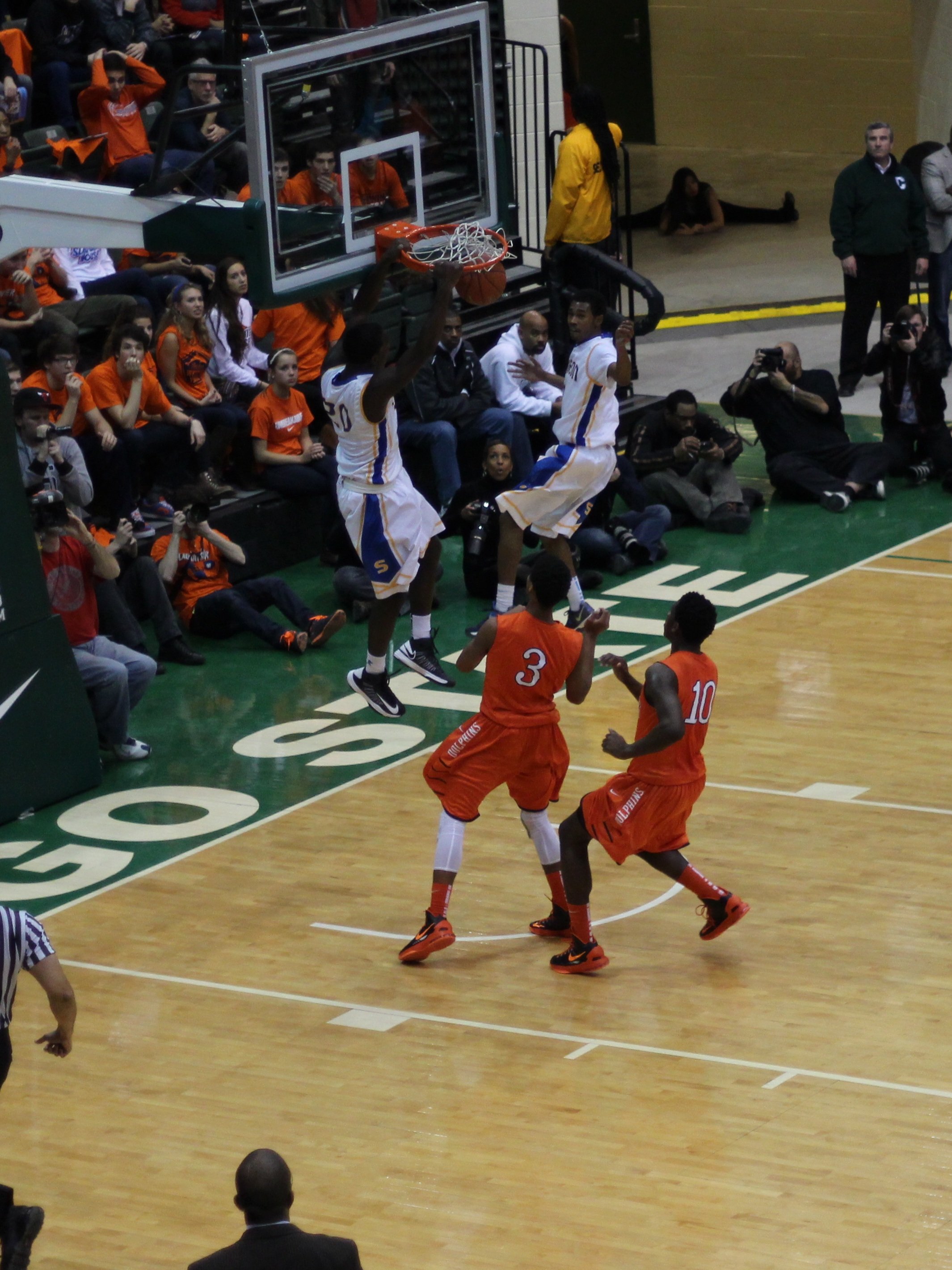
Nunn dunks an alley-oop pass from Jaylon Tate.

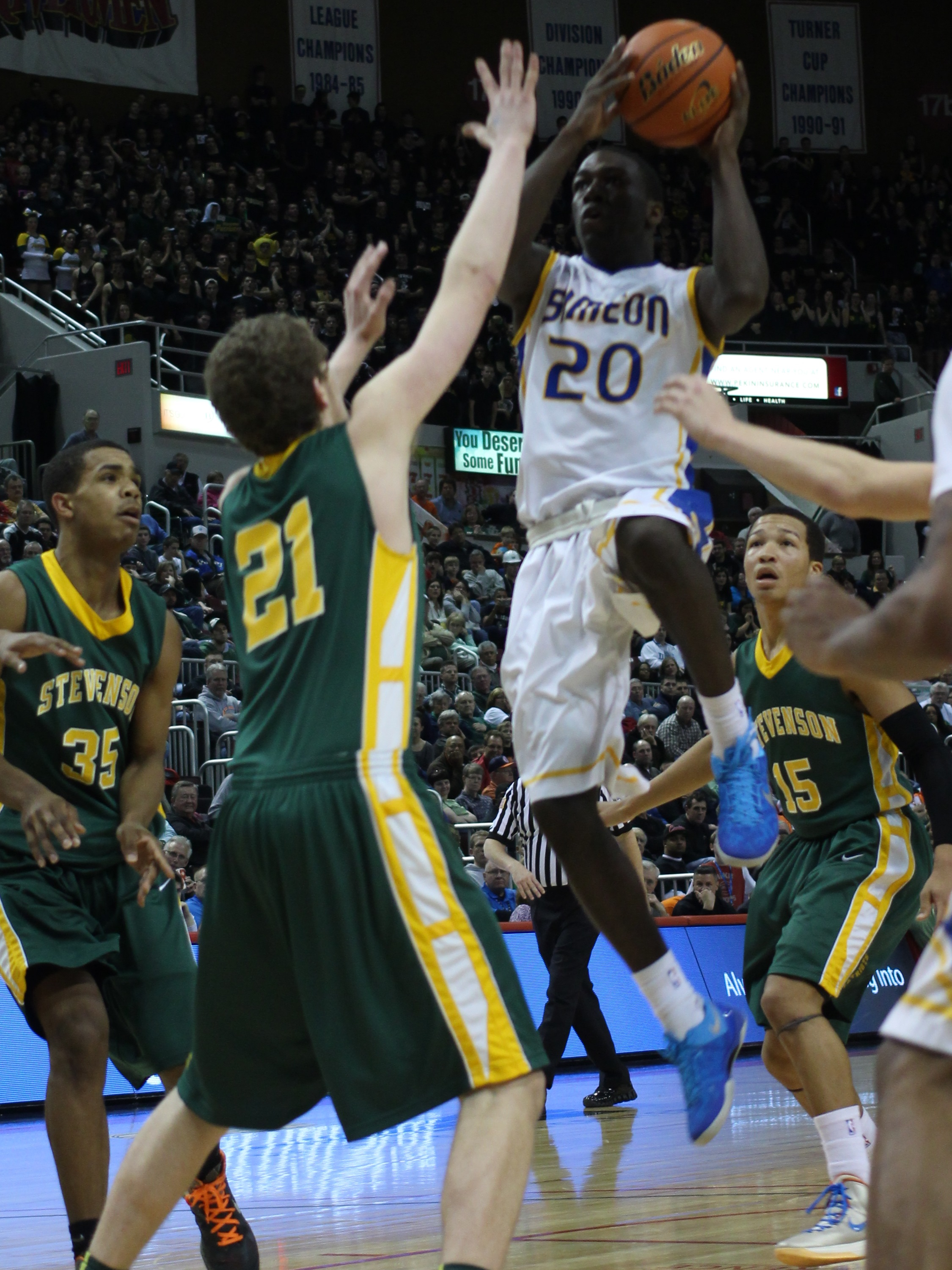
Nunn in the 2013 IHSA championship game (in front of Jalen Brunson)

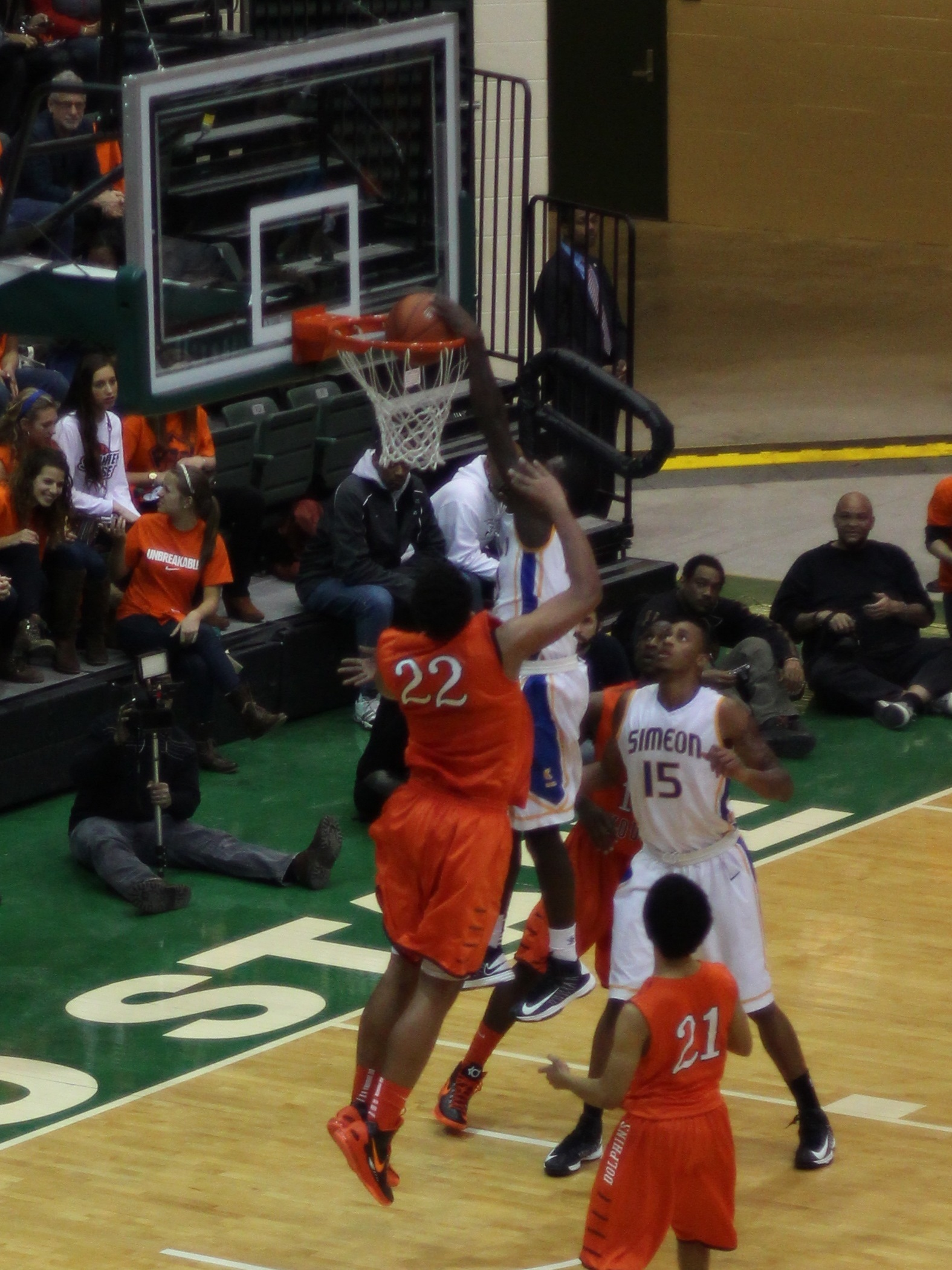
Nunn dunks an inbounds alley oop from Jabari Parker over Jahlil Okafor.

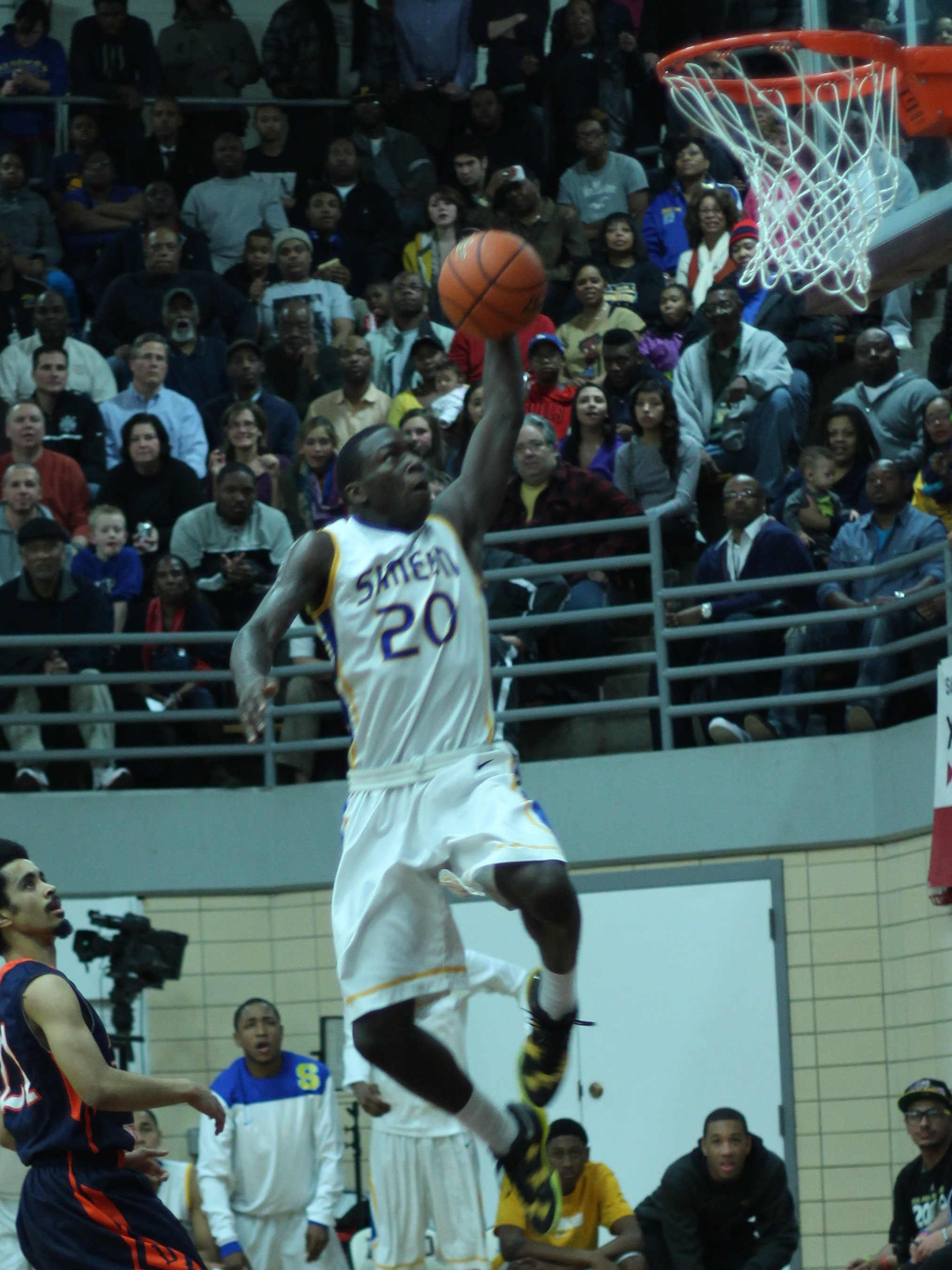
Nunn dunks in the 2013 Illinois High School Association playoffs

== College career ==
As a freshman at the University of Illinois, Nunn played for the Fighting Illini in all 35 games of their 2013–14 season and started in the last 12. He debuted as a starter on February 9, 2014, against Penn State, finishing the contest with 19 points and helping the team snap an eight-game losing streak. Nunn tied his career-high on February 19, with 19 points, to lead the Illini to a 62–49 victory at Minnesota; for this performance, he was named the Big Ten Freshman of the Week five days later. On the heels of wins over Nebraska and Michigan State, in which Nunn averaged 10.5 points, 4.5 rebounds, and 3.5 assists, he repeated as the Big Ten Freshman of the Week on March 3. At season's end, Nunn made the Big Ten All-Freshman Team selected by the coaches. Nunn was a co-captain of the 2015–16 Fighting Illini team.

Nunn was dismissed from the Illinois basketball team on May 24, 2016, after pleading guilty to a charge of misdemeanor battery two months earlier. (Note: The count of misdemeanor battery stemmed from a domestic-battery arrest in March. While Nunn told The Chicago Tribune that he did not strike the woman as alleged and only poured water on her, he said that he agreed to a misdemeanor charge at the urging of his lawyer and added that he thoroughly regretted his confrontation at any rate. "My actions, I can’t blame anyone for," he said. "Now, I would have just walked away from it.") About a month later, he transferred to Oakland University, where he had the opportunity to revitalize his career with the Golden Grizzlies. (Note: After his dismissal from Illinois, Nunn's reputation and career were in doubt; but after completing a hundred hours of community service, a 26-week abuse prevention program, and a letter of apology while under 18 months of court supervision, Nunn was given a second chance by coach Greg Kampe at Oakland. Kampe, who is one of the more respected figures in college basketball according to The Athletic, has always vouched for Nunn and the way he treated people while a part of his program.) As required by NCAA transfer rules, Nunn sat out his first year there, relegated to the bench for the 2016–17 season. While playing in the Golden Grizzlies' 2017–18 campaign, Nunn earned Horizon League Player of the Week on November 13 and did so again on December 18 and January 22.

As a senior, Nunn led the NCAA Division I in three-point shooting, with an average of 4.47 three-point field goals made per game; and he finished second in scoring to Trae Young, with 25.9 points per contest. On February 28, 2018, Nunn was voted the Horizon League Player of the Year and also earned First Team All-League honors. His 4.47 three-point shots per game average was a school single-season record. Nunn's 84 three-point shots made was a Horizon League single-season record for conference games.

== Professional career ==
=== Santa Cruz Warriors (2018–2019) ===
After going undrafted in the 2018 NBA draft, Nunn signed a partially guaranteed contract with the Golden State Warriors; it guaranteed him at least a spot on their Summer League roster and an invitation to their fall camp, as well as some money. The Warriors ultimately declined to take him on, releasing him on October 12. He was then added to the roster of their G League affiliate, the Santa Cruz Warriors. In his November 4 professional debut for the team, Nunn recorded 15 points in a 118–108 win versus the Northern Arizona Suns. On November 10, he scored 32 points off the bench against the Iowa Energy. Despite starting in only one of 49 games, he averaged 19.3 points, 3.8 rebounds, 2.8 assists, 1.4 steals, 0.3 blocks across 29 minutes per contest.

=== Miami Heat (2019–2021) ===
The Miami Heat announced that they had signed Nunn on April 10, 2019. On October 18, Nunn made a significant impression during the preseason finale against the Houston Rockets by posting 40 points, the highest score by a Heat player in a preseason game in the last 20 years. His NBA debut came on October 23 in the Heat's season opener against the Memphis Grizzlies, when he started and had 24 points, 2 rebounds, 3 assists, and 2 steals during the 120–101 victory. After his first week in the league, his three-game average of 22.3 points earned him an NBA Player of the Week nomination. In his first five NBA games, Nunn posted 112 points to break the record for the most points in as many games by an undrafted player; Connie Hawkins had set the previous record with 105 points in 1969. The 112-point tally was also the most recorded by a rookie in his first five games since Kevin Durant scored 113 in 2007. On December 3, Nunn was named Eastern Conference Rookie of the Month after averaging 16.4 points, 3.2 assists and 1.3 steals per contest. On December 10, he posted a career-high 36 points to help the Heat secure a 135–121 overtime win versus the Atlanta Hawks. In that game teammate Duncan Robinson added 34 points, establishing an NBA record for points by an undrafted duo (70). After scoring 504 points in his 31st career game, he became the fastest rookie to reach 500 points in franchise history (one game faster than Dwyane Wade). On January 2, Nunn became the first undrafted player in NBA history to win multiple Rookie of the Month awards and joined Caron Butler (4) as the only Heat players with multiple awards. He won the Rookie of the Month award for a third time for his January performance. He was named to the Rising Stars Challenge at the 2020 NBA All-Star Game, scoring 16 points for Team USA. On September 15, 2020, Nunn was named 2019–20 NBA All-Rookie First Team and finished second in Rookie of the Year voting.

On September 30, 2020, Nunn tallied 18 points during Game 1 of the 2020 NBA Finals against the Los Angeles Lakers, which is the most points scored by a rookie off the bench in a Finals game since Elden Campbell's 21 points in 1991. The Heat went on to lose the series in 6 games.

On May 15, 2021, Nunn scored a season-high 31 points, alongside six rebounds and three assists, in a 108–122 loss to the Milwaukee Bucks. The Heat lost in 4 games to the Bucks during the first round of the 2021 NBA playoffs. On August 3, the Heat rescinded Nunn's qualifying offer, making him an unrestricted free agent.

=== Los Angeles Lakers (2021–2023) ===
On August 6, 2021, Nunn signed a two-year, $10 million contract with the Los Angeles Lakers. On October 21, he was diagnosed with a bone bruise in his right knee and was expected to miss multiple weeks. On December 6, coach Frank Vogel said that Nunn was likely to not return during December. On January 17, 2022, Nunn suffered a setback in his rehab. On February 8, he was ruled out until at least late March. He ultimately missed the entire season due to knee injury.

On October 18, 2022, Nunn made his Lakers debut, scoring 13 points in a 109–123 loss to the Golden State Warriors. On January 6, 2023, he scored a season-high 23 points, alongside three rebounds, two assists, and one steal, in a 130–114 win over the Atlanta Hawks.

=== Washington Wizards (2023) ===
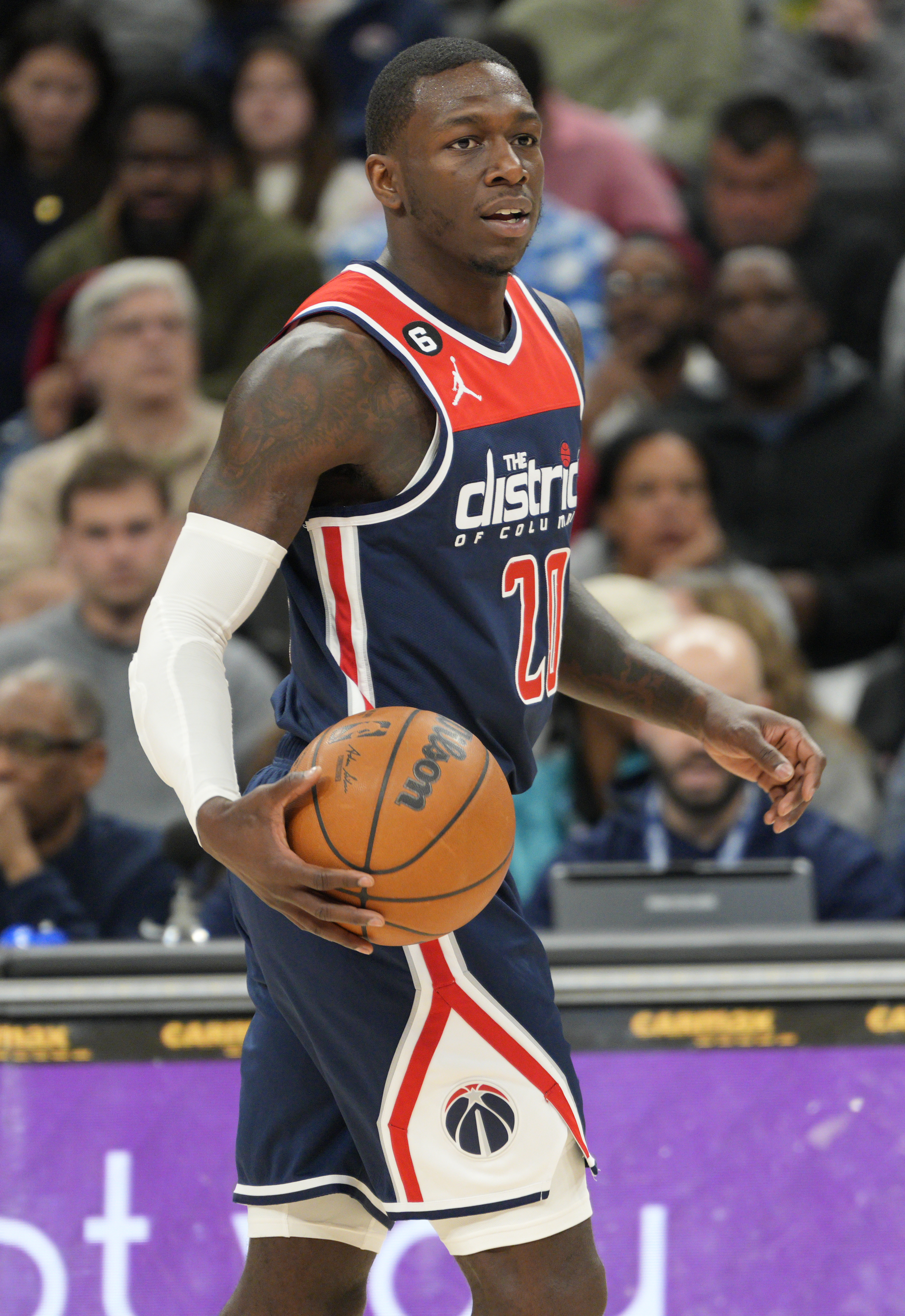
Nunn with the Washington Wizards in 2023

On January 23, 2023, Nunn was traded, alongside three future second-round draft picks, to the Washington Wizards in exchange for Rui Hachimura. Nunn made his Wizards debut two days later, recording 12 points, four rebounds, four assists and two steals off the bench in a 108–103 win over the Houston Rockets.

=== Panathinaikos (2023–present) ===
On October 31, 2023, Kendrick Nunn signed with Greek Basketball League and EuroLeague powerhouse Panathinaikos until the end of the season.

On November 20, 2023, just weeks after joining, Nunn recorded 18 points, six rebounds, four assists, and three steals, along with two game-winning free throws in an 86–85 victory against AEK.

He went on to win the 2023–24 EuroLeague title in his first season in Europe, earning All-EuroLeague First Team honors in the process. He also won the Greek League title the same year.

In the 2024–25 EuroLeague season, Nunn delivered a standout performance in Game 5 of the playoffs against Maccabi Playtika Tel Aviv. He scored 26 points, including 13 in the fourth quarter, leading Panathinaikos to an 81–72 victory and securing their spot in the Final Four. Nunn also contributed five rebounds, four assists, one steal, and one block, setting a new personal best with a 27 PIR, the highest of any player in Game 5.

In December 2024, Nunn set EuroLeague records for most points in a first quarter (21) and most three-pointers in a single quarter (7) during a game against EA7 Emporio Armani Milan.

He also set a new EuroLeague regular season record with 101 three-pointers made during the 2024–25 season.

On March 29, 2025, it was reported that Nunn had agreed upon a new three-year extension with the defending EuroLeague champions through 2028, signing a contract on April 10 of the same year; the deal was made official.

Nunn's contract extension was valued at €13.5 million over three years (approximately €4.5 million per year), making him the highest-paid player in EuroLeague history at the time of signing. He was later surpassed by Vasilije Micić, who signed a €14 million, three-year deal with Hapoel Tel Aviv in July 2025.

== National team career ==
In March 2011, Nunn was among the 24 high school players invited to the United States Olympic Training Center in Colorado Springs, Colorado, to try out for the FIBA Americas Under-16 Championship. Nunn was one of four Chicago talents to make it past the 27-man tryouts and join the 12-man national team. He went on to win a gold medal with Team USA in the 2011 FIBA Under-16 Americas Championship in Cancun, Mexico. The team, coached by Don Showalter of Mid-Prairie High, scored over 100 points in each victorious matchup.

Nunn, along with teammate Jabari Parker of Simeon and rival Jahlil Okafor of Whitney Young high school, was selected to play in the 2012 FIBA Under-17 World Championship held in Kaunas, Lithuania, from June 29 to July 8, 2012. As with the 2011 FIBA Under-16 Americas Championship, Nunn once again helped Team USA capture a gold medal.

== Career statistics ==
Legend
GP	Games played	GS	Games started	MPG	Minutes per game
FG%	Field-goal percentage	3P%	3-point field-goal percentage	FT%	Free-throw percentage
RPG	Rebounds per game	APG	Assists per game	SPG	Steals per game
BPG	Blocks per game	PPG	Points per game	PIR	Performance index rating
**Bold**	Career high

=== NBA ===
==== Regular season ====
Year	Team	GP	GS	MPG	FG%	3P%	FT%	RPG	APG	SPG	BPG	PPG
2019–20	Miami	**67**	**67**	29.3	.439	.350	.850	2.7	**3.3**	.8	.2	**15.3**
2020–21	Miami	56	44	**29.5**	**.485**	.381	**.933**	**3.2**	2.6	**.9**	**.3**	14.6
2022–23	L.A. Lakers	39	2	13.5	.406	.325	.810	1.4	.9	.3	.1	6.7
2022–23	Washington	31	0	14.1	.447	**.392**	.900	1.7	1.8	.5	.1	7.5
Career		193	113	23.7	.451	.362	.876	2.4	2.4	.7	.2	12.1

==== Playoffs ====
Year	Team	GP	GS	MPG	FG%	3P%	FT%	RPG	APG	SPG	BPG	PPG
2020	Miami	**15**	0	15.9	.391	**.279**	**1.000**	**2.1**	1.3	.2	**.2**	6.1
2021	Miami	4	**2**	**23.3**	**.395**	.278	**1.000**	1.5	**1.5**	**.5**	—	**10.3**
Career		19	2	17.5	.393	.279	1.000	2.0	1.4	.3	.2	7.0

=== EuroLeague ===
†	Denotes season in which Nunn won the EuroLeague
*	Led the league

Year	Team	GP	GS	MPG	FG%	3P%	FT%	RPG	APG	SPG	BPG	PPG	PIR
2023–24†	Panathinaikos	35	27	27.5	.446	**.410**	**.959***	2.7	3.0	.9	.1	16.0	11.7
2024–25	Panathinaikos	**40**	**39**	**30.5**	.483	.392	.862	**3.5**	**4.2**	**1.0**	**.2**	**20.0**	**18.7**
2025–26	Panathinaikos	37	33	29.4	**.504**	.380	.889	2.7	3.5	**1.0**	.1	18.3	15.6
Career		112	99	29.2	.479	.393	.894	3.1	3.5	.9	.1	18.2	15.5

=== Domestic leagues ===
Year	Team	League	GP	MPG	FG%	3P%	FT%	RPG	APG	SPG	BPG	PPG
2018–19	(United States) Santa Cruz Warriors	G League	**49**	**29.0**	.473	.333	.857	**3.8**	2.8	**1.5**	**.3**	**19.3**
2023–24	(Greece) Panathinaikos	GBL	30	25.6	.468	.369	.889	2.9	**4.0**	.7	**.3**	13.9
2024–25	(Greece) Panathinaikos	GBL	28	24.0	**.532**	**.472**	**.942**	2.9	3.6	.7	.0	13.8
2025–26	(Greece) Panathinaikos	GBL	21	24.5	.481	.385	.872	2.8	3.2	.8	.1	15.2

=== College ===
Year	Team	GP	GS	MPG	FG%	3P%	FT%	RPG	APG	SPG	BPG	PPG
2013–14	Illinois	**35**	12	19.5	**.456**	.388	.808	1.7	1.1	.6	.1	6.2
2014–15	Illinois	33	24	30.2	.401	.360	.817	3.5	1.9	1.2	.2	11.1
2015–16	Illinois	28	25	35.1	.428	.391	.794	**5.0**	1.7	**1.5**	.2	15.5
2016–17	Oakland	Redshirt										
2017–18	Oakland	30	**26**	**37.9**	.435	**.394**	**.838**	4.7	**3.8**	**1.5**	**.4**	**25.9**
Career		126	87	30.1	.428	.386	.821	3.6	2.1	1.2	.2	14.2

== Records ==
=== NBA ===
- Total points in first five career games for an undrafted player (112)
- Single-game points by an undrafted duo (70, 34 by Duncan Robinson)
- Conference rookie of the month awards for an undrafted player (3)

=== Miami Heat ===
- Fastest rookie to 500 career points (31 games)

=== Horizon League ===
- Single-season (conference games) three-point shots made (84)

=== Oakland Golden Grizzlies ===
- Single-season three-point shots made/game (4.47)

=== EuroLeague ===
- Best free throw percentage – 95.9% for players with more than 50 free throws attempted.
- Most three-pointers scored in a single quarter – 7 out of 8 attempts, Panathinaikos vs EA7 Emporio Armani Milan, December 17, 2024.
- Most points in a single quarter (tie) – 21 points, Panathinaikos vs EA7 Emporio Armani Milan, December 17, 2024.
- Most points in a fourth quarter (with 100 FG%) - 23 points, Panathinaikos vs Real Madrid, November 4, 2026.

== See also ==
- List of NCAA Division I men's basketball season 3-point field goal leaders
