= 2023–24 EuroLeague regular season =

European basketball competition

The 2023–24 EuroLeague regular season is the premier European competition for men's basketball clubs. A total of 18 teams compete in the regular season to decide the eight places of the playoffs.

== Format ==
In the regular season, teams play against each other home-and-away in a round-robin format. The six first qualified teams will advance to the playoffs, while the teams ranked seventh through tenth will advance to the play-in showdown to decide seventh- and eighth-place teams in playoffs. The last ten qualified teams will be eliminated. The matchdays are from 5 October 2023 to 12 April 2024.

=== Tiebreakers ===
When all teams have played each other twice:

1. Best record in head-to-head games between all tied teams.
2. Higher cumulative score difference in head-to-head games between all tied teams.
3. Higher cumulative score difference for the entire regular season.
4. Higher total of points scored for the entire regular season.
5. Higher sum of quotients of points in favor and points against of each match played in the regular season.

If a tiebreaker does not resolve a tie completely, a new tiebreak process is initiated with only those teams that remain tied. All points scored in extra periods will not be counted in the standings, nor for any tie-break situation.

== League table ==
Pos	Team	Pld	W	L	PF	PA	PD	Qualification
1	(Spanish Basketball Federation) Real Madrid	34	27	7	2924	2681	+243	Qualification to playoffs
2	(Hellenic Basketball Federation) Panathinaikos AKTOR	34	23	11	2752	2580	+172	Qualification to playoffs
3	(French Federation of Basketball) AS Monaco	34	23	11	2770	2671	+99	Qualification to playoffs
4	(Spanish Basketball Federation) Barcelona	34	22	12	2812	2692	+120	Qualification to playoffs
5	(Hellenic Basketball Federation) Olympiacos	34	22	12	2658	2538	+120	Qualification to playoffs
6	(Turkish Basketball Federation) Fenerbahçe Beko	34	20	14	2855	2723	+132	Qualification to playoffs
7	(Israeli Basketball Association) Maccabi Playtika Tel Aviv	34	20	14	2969	2939	+30	Qualification to play-in
8	(Spanish Basketball Federation) Baskonia	34	18	16	2849	2867	−18	Qualification to play-in
9	(Turkish Basketball Federation) Anadolu Efes	34	17	17	2871	2855	+16	Qualification to play-in
10	(Italian Basketball Federation) Virtus Segafredo Bologna	34	17	17	2728	2804	−76	Qualification to play-in
11	(Basketball Federation of Serbia) Partizan Mozzart Bet	34	16	18	2782	2802	−20	
12	(Italian Basketball Federation) EA7 Emporio Armani Milan	34	15	19	2645	2631	+14	
13	(Spanish Basketball Federation) Valencia Basket	34	14	20	2578	2674	−96	
14	(Lithuanian Basketball Federation) Žalgiris	34	14	20	2694	2692	+2	
15	(German Basketball Federation) Bayern Munich	34	13	21	2604	2724	−120	
16	(Basketball Federation of Serbia) Crvena zvezda Meridianbet	34	11	23	2764	2816	−52	
17	(French Federation of Basketball) LDLC ASVEL	34	9	25	2646	2859	−213	
18	(German Basketball Federation) ALBA Berlin	34	5	29	2591	2944	−353	

Source: EuroLeague
Rules for classification: All points scored in extra period(s) were not counted in the standings, nor for any tie-break situation.

== Positions by round ==
The table lists the positions of teams after completion of each round. In order to preserve chronological evolvements, any postponed matches are not included in the round at which they were originally scheduled, but added to the full round they were played immediately afterwards.

Leader and qualification to playoffs	Qualification to playoffs	Qualification to play-in

Team ╲ Round	1	2	3	4	5	6	7	8	9	10	11	12	13	14	15	16	17	18	19	20	21	22	23	24	25	26	27	28	29	30	31	32	33	34
Real Madrid	7	2	1	2	1	1	1	1	1	1	1	1	1	1	1	1	1	1	1	1	1	1	1	1	1	1	1	1	1	1	1	1	1	1
Panathinaikos AKTOR	11	9	13	15	10	12	8	8	5	4	5	7	11	9	6	4	4	5	4	4	4	4	4	3	4	3	3	3	4	3	2	2	2	2
AS Monaco	14	16	15	8	6	6	4	4	6	6	3	4	5	5	7	5	5	7	8	7	8	7	6	6	5	4	4	4	3	5	3	3	3	3
Barcelona	2	1	2	1	2	2	2	2	2	2	2	2	2	2	3	2	3	3	3	2	2	2	2	2	2	2	2	2	2	2	4	4	4	4
Olympiacos	9	13	14	9	7	8	10	9	7	5	6	8	7	10	11	11	8	6	5	8	7	6	8	7	7	6	6	5	5	6	5	6	5	5
Fenerbahçe Beko	8	12	6	4	4	4	3	5	8	9	8	10	12	11	8	7	6	10	6	5	5	5	5	4	6	7	7	6	6	4	6	5	6	6
Maccabi Playtika Tel Aviv	3	5	9	7	9	7	7	7	4	7	9	6	9	8	5	10	7	4	7	6	6	9	7	8	10	10	9	9	9	7	7	7	7	7
Baskonia	12	11	12	16	16	13	12	10	10	8	7	5	4	6	10	9	11	11	11	11	10	8	11	11	9	8	8	8	8	9	9	9	8	8
Anadolu Efes	17	17	16	11	13	15	13	11	13	11	14	13	10	12	13	13	14	15	15	16	15	15	15	16	16	14	15	13	14	13	13	10	10	9
Virtus Segafredo Bologna	13	6	4	3	3	3	5	3	3	3	4	3	3	3	2	3	2	2	2	3	3	3	3	5	3	5	5	7	7	8	8	8	9	10
Partizan Mozzart Bet	16	8	11	14	11	11	9	13	11	13	10	9	6	4	4	6	9	8	9	9	9	11	10	10	11	11	11	11	10	10	11	13	11	11
EA7 Emporio Armani Milan	10	14	8	12	14	16	14	16	15	12	15	15	15	15	14	14	13	13	12	12	12	13	12	13	13	12	13	12	13	12	10	12	12	12
Valencia Basket	5	4	3	5	5	5	6	6	9	10	13	12	8	7	9	8	10	9	10	10	11	10	9	9	8	9	10	10	11	11	12	14	13	13
Žalgiris	6	3	7	6	8	9	11	14	12	14	11	14	14	16	16	16	16	16	16	15	16	16	16	15	14	13	14	15	15	15	15	11	14	14
Bayern Munich	4	10	5	10	12	14	16	15	16	15	12	11	13	13	12	12	12	12	14	14	14	14	15	14	15	15	12	14	12	14	14	15	15	15
Crvena zvezda Meridianbet	1	7	10	13	15	10	15	12	14	16	16	16	16	14	15	15	15	14	13	13	13	12	13	12	12	16	16	16	16	16	16	16	16	16
LDLC ASVEL	18	18	18	18	18	18	18	17	17	17	17	17	17	17	18	18	18	18	17	17	18	18	18	18	18	18	17	17	17	17	17	17	17	17
ALBA Berlin	15	15	17	17	17	17	17	18	18	18	18	18	18	18	17	17	17	17	18	18	17	17	17	17	17	17	18	18	18	18	18	18	18	18

Source: EuroLeague

== Results by round ==
The table lists the results of teams in each round.

Win	Loss

Team ╲ Round	1	2	3	4	5	6	7	8	9	10	11	12	13	14	15	16	17	18	19	20	21	22	23	24	25	26	27	28	29	30	31	32	33	34
ALBA Berlin	L	L	L	L	W	L	L	L	L	L	L	W	L	L	W	L	L	L	L	L	W	L	W	L	L	L	L	L	L	L	L	L	L	L
Anadolu Efes	L	L	W	W	L	L	W	W	L	W	L	W	W	L	L	L	L	L	L	L	W	W	L	L	W	W	L	W	L	W	W	W	W	W
Barcelona	W	W	W	W	L	W	W	L	W	W	W	L	W	L	L	W	L	W	W	W	W	L	L	W	W	W	L	W	W	L	L	W	W	L
Baskonia	L	W	L	L	L	W	W	W	W	L	W	W	W	L	L	W	L	W	L	L	W	W	L	L	W	W	L	W	W	L	L	L	W	W
Bayern Munich	W	L	W	L	L	L	L	W	L	W	W	W	L	L	W	L	W	L	L	L	L	W	L	W	L	W	W	L	W	L	L	L	L	L
Crvena zvezda Meridianbet	W	L	L	L	L	W	L	W	L	L	W	L	L	W	L	W	L	W	W	L	W	L	L	W	L	L	L	L	L	L	W	L	L	L
EA7 Emporio Armani Milan	L	L	W	L	L	L	W	L	W	W	L	L	L	W	W	L	W	L	W	W	L	L	W	L	L	W	L	W	L	W	W	L	W	L
Fenerbahçe Beko	W	L	W	W	W	W	L	L	L	L	W	L	L	W	W	W	W	L	W	W	W	L	W	W	L	L	W	W	W	W	L	W	L	L
LDLC ASVEL	L	L	L	L	L	W	L	W	L	L	L	L	L	L	L	L	L	L	W	W	L	L	W	L	L	L	W	L	W	L	L	L	W	W
Maccabi Playtika Tel Aviv	W	W	L	W	L	L	W	L	W	L	W	W	L	W	W	L	W	W	L	W	L	L	W	L	L	L	W	W	W	W	W	W	L	W
AS Monaco	L	L	W	W	W	W	W	L	L	W	W	L	W	L	L	W	W	L	L	W	L	W	W	W	W	W	W	W	W	L	W	W	W	W
Olympiacos	W	L	L	W	W	L	L	W	W	W	L	L	W	L	L	W	W	W	W	L	L	W	L	W	W	W	W	W	W	L	W	W	W	W
Panathinaikos AKTOR	L	W	L	L	W	L	W	W	W	W	L	L	L	W	W	W	W	L	W	W	W	W	L	W	L	W	W	W	L	W	W	W	W	W
Partizan Mozzart Bet	L	W	L	L	W	L	W	L	W	L	W	W	W	W	W	L	L	W	L	L	W	L	W	L	L	L	W	L	L	W	L	L	W	W
Real Madrid	W	W	W	W	W	W	W	W	W	W	L	W	W	W	W	W	W	L	W	W	W	L	W	W	W	L	L	L	W	W	W	W	L	W
Valencia Basket	W	W	W	L	W	W	L	L	L	L	L	W	W	W	L	W	L	W	L	L	L	W	W	L	W	L	L	L	L	W	L	L	L	L
Virtus Segafredo Bologna	L	W	W	W	W	W	L	W	L	W	L	W	W	W	W	L	W	W	W	L	L	W	L	L	W	L	W	L	L	L	L	L	L	L
Žalgiris	W	W	L	W	L	L	L	L	W	L	W	L	L	L	L	L	L	W	L	W	L	W	L	W	W	W	L	L	L	W	W	W	L	L

Source: EuroLeague

== Matches ==
=== Round 1 ===
5 October 2023	Crvena zvezda Meridianbet (Basketball Federation of Serbia)	94–73	(French Federation of Basketball) LDLC ASVEL	Belgrade
19:00 (CEST)	Scoring by quarter: 29–18, 23–13, 17–24, 25–18
	Pts: Napier 21; Rebs: three players 5 Asts: Giedraitis, Kuzmić 4 PIR: Giedraitis, Napier 20	Boxscore	Pts: Lauvergne 18; Rebs: Lauvergne 6 Asts: Lee 9 PIR: Lauvergne 19	Arena: Štark Arena; Attendance: 18,360; Referees: Fernando Rocha, Carmelo Paternicò, Piotr Pastusiak

5 October 2023	Maccabi Playtika Tel Aviv (Israeli Basketball Association)	96–81	(Basketball Federation of Serbia) Partizan Mozzart Bet	Tel Aviv
20:05 (CEST)	Scoring by quarter: 27–16, 28–27, 19–15, 22–23
	Pts: Brown 22; Rebs: Colson 7 Asts: Blatt, Brown 8 PIR: Brown 25	Boxscore	Pts: Avramović 24; Rebs: five players 3 Asts: Dozier, Jaramaz 3 PIR: Avramović 23	Arena: Menora Mivtachim Arena; Attendance: 10,559; Referees: Miguel Ángel Pérez, Gytis Vilius, Luka Kardum

5 October 2023	Virtus Segafredo Bologna (Italian Basketball Federation)	79–82	(Lithuanian Basketball Federation) Žalgiris	Bologna
20:30 (CEST)	Scoring by quarter: 23–15, 19–22, 23–21, 14–24
	Pts: Mickey 18; Rebs: Mickey 6 Asts: Cordinier 9 PIR: Cordinier 22	Boxscore	Pts: Evans 25; Rebs: Hayes 8 Asts: Dimša, Ulanovas 3 PIR: Evans 20	Arena: PalaDozza; Attendance: 4,437; Referees: Matej Boltauzer, Anne Panther, Sérgio Silva

5 October 2023	Bayern Munich (German Basketball Federation)	80–68	(German Basketball Federation) ALBA Berlin	Munich
20:30 (CEST)	Scoring by quarter: 19–17, 17–27, 25–7, 19–17
	Pts: Francisco 17; Rebs: Bonga 10; Asts: Bolmaro, Francisco 3 PIR: Francisco 20	Boxscore	Pts: Thiemann, Olinde 12; Rebs: Thiemann 5 Asts: three players 3 PIR: Thiemann 17	Arena: BMW Park; Attendance: 6,057; Referees: Juan Carlos García, Oļegs Latiševs, Artūras Šukys

5 October 2023	Barcelona (Spanish Basketball Federation)	91–74	(Turkish Basketball Federation) Anadolu Efes	Barcelona
20:30 (CEST)	Scoring by quarter: 22–19, 18–15, 29–30, 22–10
	Pts: Hernangómez 18; Rebs: Veselý 7 Asts: Laprovíttola 8 PIR: Hernangómez 24	Boxscore	Pts: Larkin 16; Rebs: Willis 6 Asts: Larkin 12; PIR: Larkin 26	Arena: Palau Blaugrana; Attendance: 5,577; Referees: Sreten Radović, Mehdi Difallah, Milivoje Jovčić

6 October 2023	Fenerbahçe Beko (Turkish Basketball Federation)	85–82(OT)	(Italian Basketball Federation) EA7 Emporio Armani Milan	Istanbul
19:45 (CEST)	Scoring by quarter: 19–23, 19–12, 24–19, 14–22, Overtime: 9–6
	Pts: Wilbekin 19; Rebs: Pierre 6 Asts: Wilbekin 4 PIR: Wilbekin 16	Boxscore	Pts: Mirotić 27; Rebs: Mirotić 11; Asts: Pangos 5 PIR: Mirotić 38	Arena: Ülker Sports and Event Hall; Attendance: 10,211; Referees: Saša Pukl, Carlos Peruga, Uroš Nikolić

6 October 2023	Panathinaikos (Hellenic Basketball Federation)	78–88(OT)	(Hellenic Basketball Federation) Olympiacos	Marousi
20:15 (CEST)	Scoring by quarter: 22–23, 21–13, 16–16, 15–22, Overtime: 4–14
	Pts: Sloukas 20; Rebs: Lessort, Hernangómez 10; Asts: Grant, Vildoza 4 PIR: Hernangómez 25	Boxscore	Pts: Peters, Walkup 17; Rebs: Peters 10; Asts: Papanikolaou, Walkup 5 PIR: Peters 31	Arena: OAKA Altion; Attendance: 17,810; Referees: Robert Lottermoser, Emilio Pérez, Milan Nedović

6 October 2023	Valencia Basket (Spanish Basketball Federation)	70–65	(French Federation of Basketball) AS Monaco	Valencia
20:30 (CEST)	Scoring by quarter: 17–20, 22–18, 14–13, 17–14
	Pts: Ojeleye 19; Rebs: Ojeleye 7 Asts: Jović 4 PIR: Ojeleye 23	Boxscore	Pts: James 21; Rebs: James 7 Asts: James 7 PIR: James 29	Arena: La Fonteta; Attendance: 6,093; Referees: Damir Javor, Tomislav Hordov, Rain Peerandi

6 October 2023	Baskonia (Spanish Basketball Federation)	77–79	(Spanish Basketball Federation) Real Madrid	Vitoria-Gasteiz
20:30 (CEST)	Scoring by quarter: 23–19, 24–24, 20–19, 10–17
	Pts: Costello 16; Rebs: Diop 11; Asts: Howard 5 PIR: Moneke 22	Boxscore	Pts: Yabusele 18; Rebs: Yabusele 8 Asts: Campazzo 5 PIR: Yabusele 22	Arena: Buesa Arena; Attendance: 14,017; Referees: Ilija Belošević, Emin Moğulkoç, Saulius Račys

=== Round 2 ===
12 October 2023	Anadolu Efes (Turkish Basketball Federation)	80–103	(Spanish Basketball Federation) Real Madrid	Istanbul
19:30 (CEST)	Scoring by quarter: 24–26, 17–29, 19–25, 20–23
	Pts: Thompson 20; Rebs: Žižić, Thompson 7 Asts: Thompson 5 PIR: Thompson 23	Boxscore	Pts: Yabusele 22; Rebs: Yabusele, Hezonja 8 Asts: Campazzo 10; PIR: Yabusele 39	Arena: Sinan Erdem Dome; Attendance: 15,012; Referees: Matej Boltauzer, Uroš Nikolić, Joseph Bissang

12 October 2023	ALBA Berlin (German Basketball Federation)	86–91	(Spanish Basketball Federation) Baskonia	Berlin
20:00 (CEST)	Scoring by quarter: 21–25, 26–26, 14–25, 25–15
	Pts: Schneider 17; Rebs: Thiemann 10; Asts: Thomas 6 PIR: Thiemann 22	Boxscore	Pts: Miller-McIntyre 17; Rebs: Sedekerskis 13; Asts: Howard 5 PIR: Sedekerskis 21	Arena: Mercedes-Benz Arena; Attendance: 7,766; Referees: Fernando Rocha, Miloš Koljenšić, Tomasz Trawicki

12 October 2023	LDLC ASVEL (French Federation of Basketball)	62–88	(Basketball Federation of Serbia) Partizan Mozzart Bet	Villeurbanne
20:00 (CEST)	Scoring by quarter: 13–17, 16–26, 19–29, 14–16
	Pts: Jackson 16; Rebs: three players 5 Asts: Lee 3 PIR: Luwawu-Cabarrot, Jackson 11	Boxscore	Pts: Nunnally 17; Rebs: LeDay 7 Asts: Nunnally 6 PIR: LeDay 27	Arena: Astroballe; Attendance: 5,328; Referees: Robert Lottermoser, Emin Moğulkoç, Josip Radojković

12 October 2023	Panathinaikos (Hellenic Basketball Federation)	78–71	(German Basketball Federation) Bayern Munich	Marousi
20:15 (CEST)	Scoring by quarter: 23–11, 14–19, 17–18, 24–23
	Pts: Lessort 16; Rebs: Hernangómez, Lessort 6 Asts: Vildoza 5 PIR: Lessort 20	Boxscore	Pts: Bolmaro 19; Rebs: Booker 7 Asts: four players 2 PIR: Bolmaro 24	Arena: OAKA Altion; Attendance: 8,352; Referees: Ilija Belošević, Carlos Peruga, Mario Majkić

13 October 2023	AS Monaco (French Federation of Basketball)	59–83	(Italian Basketball Federation) Virtus Segafredo Bologna	Fontvieille
19:00 (CEST)	Scoring by quarter: 15–23, 18–25, 15–22, 11–13
	Pts: James 14; Rebs: Cornelie 6 Asts: Motiejūnas, James 3 PIR: James 11	Boxscore	Pts: Lundberg 14; Rebs: Dunston, Mickey 8 Asts: Lundberg, Shengelia 4 PIR: Shengelia 18	Arena: Salle Gaston Médecin; Attendance: 3,570; Referees: Sreten Radović, Oļegs Latiševs, Jordi Aliaga

13 October 2023	Žalgiris (Lithuanian Basketball Federation)	79–74	(Basketball Federation of Serbia) Crvena zvezda Meridianbet	Kaunas
19:00 (CEST)	Scoring by quarter: 19–21, 16–17, 15–18, 29–18
	Pts: Šmits 18; Rebs: Šmits 7 Asts: Evans 5 PIR: Šmits 21	Boxscore	Pts: Mitrović 16; Rebs: Mitrović 8 Asts: Nedović, Teodosić 4 PIR: Mitrović 20	Arena: Žalgirio Arena; Attendance: 15,044; Referees: Mehdi Difallah, Milan Nedović, Carlos Cortés

13 October 2023	Olympiacos (Hellenic Basketball Federation)	68–77	(Spanish Basketball Federation) Barcelona	Piraeus
20:15 (CEST)	Scoring by quarter: 16–23, 18–17, 20–16, 14–21
	Pts: Walkup 14; Rebs: three players 4 Asts: three players 3 PIR: Milutinov 18	Boxscore	Pts: Laprovíttola 17; Rebs: Hernangómez 7 Asts: Laprovíttola 7 PIR: Laprovíttola 22	Arena: Peace and Friendship Stadium; Attendance: 12,219; Referees: Saša Pukl, Gytis Vilius, Sérgio Silva

13 October 2023	Valencia Basket (Spanish Basketball Federation)	77–74	(Turkish Basketball Federation) Fenerbahçe Beko	Valencia
20:30 (CEST)	Scoring by quarter: 22–9, 17–24, 19–20, 19–21
	Pts: Davies 18; Rebs: Ojeleye 7 Asts: Jones 7 PIR: Davies 21	Boxscore	Pts: Dorsey 17; Rebs: Hayes-Davis 6 Asts: Dorsey, Madar 3 PIR: Dorsey 17	Arena: La Fonteta; Attendance: 7,037; Referees: Milivoje Jovčić, Jakub Zamojski, Anne Panther

31 October 2023	EA7 Emporio Armani Milan (Italian Basketball Federation)	90–98	(Israeli Basketball Association) Maccabi Playtika Tel Aviv	Assago
20:30 (CET)	Scoring by quarter: 32–25, 20–25, 20–25, 18–23
	Pts: Mirotić 24; Rebs: Voigtmann 6 Asts: Shields 8 PIR: Shields 30	Boxscore	Pts: Rivero 21; Rebs: Colson, Nebo 6 Asts: Brown 12; PIR: Rivero 26	Arena: Mediolanum Forum; Attendance: 8,037; Referees: Damir Javor, Anne Panther, Marcin Kowalski
Note: The match was originally to be played on 12 October at 20:30 (21:30 IST), but was postponed and rescheduled due to the Gaza war.

=== Round 3 ===
17 October 2023	Partizan Mozzart Bet (Basketball Federation of Serbia)	83–92	(Spanish Basketball Federation) Barcelona	Belgrade
18:30 (CEST)	Scoring by quarter: 16–23, 18–21, 26–25, 23–23
	Pts: Nunnally 14; Rebs: LeDay 5 Asts: Dozier 5 PIR: LeDay 17	Boxscore	Pts: Laprovíttola 20; Rebs: Parker 11; Asts: Laprovíttola, Satoranský 6 PIR: Laprovíttola, Veselý 22	Arena: Štark Arena; Attendance: 19,227; Referees: Fernando Rocha, Piotr Pastusiak, Artūras Šukys

17 October 2023	Fenerbahçe Beko (Turkish Basketball Federation)	83–69	(Hellenic Basketball Federation) Panathinaikos	Istanbul
19:15 (CEST)	Scoring by quarter: 27–9, 16–19, 24–17, 16–24
	Pts: Papagiannis 15; Rebs: Pierre 10; Asts: Calathes, Gudurić 5 PIR: Gudurić 22	Boxscore	Pts: Lessort 19; Rebs: Hernangómez 6 Asts: Grant 3 PIR: Lessort 25	Arena: Ülker Sports and Event Hall; Attendance: 11,115; Referees: Sreten Radović, Carmelo Paternicò, Gentian Cici

17 October 2023	Anadolu Efes (Turkish Basketball Federation)	89–84	(French Federation of Basketball) LDLC ASVEL	Istanbul
19:30 (CEST)	Scoring by quarter: 24–24, 19–11, 27–21, 19–28
	Pts: Clyburn 19; Rebs: Larkin, Clyburn 6 Asts: Larkin 6 PIR: Larkin 23	Boxscore	Pts: de Colo 25; Rebs: Ndiaye 8 Asts: Lee 5 PIR: de Colo 27	Arena: Sinan Erdem Dome; Attendance: 7,816; Referees: Emilio Pérez, Sašo Petek, Kristaps Konstantinovs

17 October 2023	Baskonia (Spanish Basketball Federation)	68–76	(German Basketball Federation) Bayern Munich	Vitoria-Gasteiz
20:30 (CEST)	Scoring by quarter: 22–20, 20–21, 20–16, 6–19
	Pts: Marinković 13; Rebs: Sedekerskis 8 Asts: Miller-McIntyre 4 PIR: Sedekerskis 14	Boxscore	Pts: Edwards 14; Rebs: Weiler-Babb 11; Asts: Weiler-Babb, Francisco 4 PIR: Edwards 19	Arena: Buesa Arena; Attendance: 7,542; Referees: Mehdi Difallah, Ioannis Foufis, Josip Radojković

17 October 2023	Real Madrid (Spanish Basketball Federation)	93–79	(Lithuanian Basketball Federation) Žalgiris	Madrid
20:45 (CEST)	Scoring by quarter: 25–19, 28–24, 19–19, 21–17
	Pts: Deck 19; Rebs: Poirier 7 Asts: Campazzo 9 PIR: Poirier, Campazzo 28	Boxscore	Pts: Šmits 12; Rebs: Ulanovas 6 Asts: three players 3 PIR: Šmits 14	Arena: WiZink Center; Attendance: 6,778; Referees: Damir Javor, Milivoje Jovčić, Miloš Koljenšić

17 October 2023	EA7 Emporio Armani Milan (Italian Basketball Federation)	65–53	(Hellenic Basketball Federation) Olympiacos	Assago
20:45 (CEST)	Scoring by quarter: 19–17, 12–15, 13–9, 21–12
	Pts: Mirotić 20; Rebs: three players 4 Asts: Voigtmann 6 PIR: Pangos 19	Boxscore	Pts: Milutinov 15; Rebs: Walkup 6 Asts: Walkup 4 PIR: Milutinov 21	Arena: Mediolanum Forum; Attendance: 9,882; Referees: Matej Boltauzer, Leandro Lezcano, Carlos Cortés

18 October 2023	Crvena zvezda Meridianbet (Basketball Federation of Serbia)	76–82	(French Federation of Basketball) AS Monaco	Belgrade
20:00 (CEST)	Scoring by quarter: 23–14, 21–24, 19–26, 13–18
	Pts: Giedraitis 20; Rebs: Simonović 5 Asts: Nedović 6 PIR: Nedović 22	Boxscore	Pts: James 18; Rebs: Diallo 8 Asts: James 11; PIR: James 24	Arena: Štark Arena; Attendance: 19,123; Referees: Saša Pukl, Saulius Račys, Luka Kardum

18 October 2023	Valencia Basket (Spanish Basketball Federation)	75–66	(Israeli Basketball Association) Maccabi Playtika Tel Aviv	Valencia
20:30 (CEST)	Scoring by quarter: 18–17, 15–12, 17–15, 25–22
	Pts: Inglis 11; Rebs: Claver 7 Asts: Jović 6 PIR: Jović, Claver 16	Boxscore	Pts: Colson 20; Rebs: Nebo 5 Asts: Brown 11; PIR: Colson 20	Arena: La Fonteta; Attendance: 2,809; Referees: Ilija Belošević, Michele Rossi, Vasiliki Tsaroucha
Note: The match was originally to be played at Menora Mivtachim Arena in Tel Aviv at 20:05 (21:05 IST), but was swapped with the reverse fixture in Valencia due to the Gaza war.

18 October 2023	Virtus Segafredo Bologna (Italian Basketball Federation)	87–76	(German Basketball Federation) ALBA Berlin	Bologna
20:30 (CEST)	Scoring by quarter: 27–11, 17–15, 23–25, 20–25
	Pts: Shengelia 26; Rebs: Mickey 5 Asts: Hackett 6 PIR: Shengelia 32	Boxscore	Pts: Brown 17; Rebs: Thiemann 10; Asts: Thiemann, Thomas 3 PIR: Brown 20	Arena: PalaDozza; Attendance: 4,806; Referees: Emin Moğulkoç, Joseph Bissang, Amit Balak

=== Round 4 ===
19 October 2023	Fenerbahçe Beko (Turkish Basketball Federation)	101–86	(French Federation of Basketball) LDLC ASVEL	Istanbul
19:45 (CEST)	Scoring by quarter: 16–28, 26–27, 30–15, 29–16
	Pts: Wilbekin 18; Rebs: Calathes 8 Asts: Calathes 9 PIR: Calathes 20	Boxscore	Pts: Jackson 25; Rebs: Kahudi 8 Asts: Lauvergne, Lee 5 PIR: Jackson 23	Arena: Ülker Sports and Event Hall; Attendance: 7,251; Referees: Matej Boltauzer, Tomasz Trawicki, Alberto Baena

19 October 2023	Olympiacos (Hellenic Basketball Federation)	98–94(OT)	(Basketball Federation of Serbia) Partizan Mozzart Bet	Piraeus
20:15 (CEST)	Scoring by quarter: 28–21, 21–22, 10–26, 26–16, Overtime: 13–9
	Pts: Larentzakis 19; Rebs: Papanikolaou, Milutinov 7 Asts: Walkup 4 PIR: Milutinov 30	Boxscore	Pts: LeDay 18; Rebs: LeDay, Punter 5 Asts: LeDay 4 PIR: LeDay 24	Arena: Peace and Friendship Stadium; Attendance: 11,579; Referees: Carmelo Paternicò, Jordi Aliaga, Mario Majkić

19 October 2023	Baskonia (Spanish Basketball Federation)	82–99	(Lithuanian Basketball Federation) Žalgiris	Vitoria-Gasteiz
20:30 (CEST)	Scoring by quarter: 14–22, 25–24, 22–28, 21–25
	Pts: Moneke 32; Rebs: Moneke 9 Asts: Miller-McIntyre 7 PIR: Moneke 37	Boxscore	Pts: Šmits 21; Rebs: Manek 14; Asts: Ulanovas 6 PIR: Šmits, Manek 27	Arena: Buesa Arena; Attendance: 7,719; Referees: Piotr Pastusiak, Marcin Kowalski, Adar Peer

19 October 2023	Real Madrid (Spanish Basketball Federation)	88–71	(Italian Basketball Federation) EA7 Emporio Armani Milan	Madrid
20:45 (CEST)	Scoring by quarter: 19–25, 23–17, 25–19, 21–10
	Pts: Llull 19; Rebs: Poirier 4 Asts: Campazzo 10; PIR: Campazzo 21	Boxscore	Pts: Shields 16; Rebs: Shields 7 Asts: Melli 4 PIR: Shields 19	Arena: WiZink Center; Attendance: 7,657; Referees: Sreten Radović, Gytis Vilius, Sašo Petek

20 October 2023	AS Monaco (French Federation of Basketball)	86–75	(German Basketball Federation) ALBA Berlin	Fontvieille
19:00 (CEST)	Scoring by quarter: 18–16, 29–24, 20–16, 19–19
	Pts: James 17; Rebs: Diallo 6 Asts: James 7 PIR: James 23	Boxscore	Pts: Thomas 17; Rebs: Thiemann 7 Asts: three players 3 PIR: Thomas 17	Arena: Salle Gaston Médecin; Attendance: 3,583; Referees: Miguel Ángel Pérez, Seffi Shemmesh, Aare Halliko

20 October 2023	Anadolu Efes (Turkish Basketball Federation)	77–73	(Spanish Basketball Federation) Valencia Basket	Istanbul
19:30 (CEST)	Scoring by quarter: 18–15, 20–25, 19–13, 20–20
	Pts: Larkin 15; Rebs: Larkin 8 Asts: Larkin 6 PIR: Larkin 26	Boxscore	Pts: Inglis 13; Rebs: Jones 8 Asts: Jones 4 PIR: Inglis 15	Arena: Sinan Erdem Dome; Attendance: 11,892; Referees: Fernando Rocha, Oļegs Latiševs, Thomas Bissuel

20 October 2023	Panathinaikos (Hellenic Basketball Federation)	81–86(OT)	(Israeli Basketball Association) Maccabi Playtika Tel Aviv	Marousi
20:15 (CEST)	Scoring by quarter: 15–20, 9–19, 25–18, 23–15, Overtime: 9–14
	Pts: Vildoza 15; Rebs: three players 5 Asts: Sloukas 8 PIR: Vildoza 16	Boxscore	Pts: Colson 21; Rebs: DiBartolomeo 9 Asts: Brown 12; PIR: Colson 24	Arena: OAKA Altion; Attendance: 6,451; Referees: Robert Lottermoser, Uroš Nikolić, Rain Peerandi

20 October 2023	Barcelona (Spanish Basketball Federation)	98–59	(German Basketball Federation) Bayern Munich	Barcelona
20:30 (CEST)	Scoring by quarter: 27–11, 16–16, 27–13, 28–19
	Pts: Parker 15; Rebs: Hernangómez 7 Asts: Laprovíttola 6 PIR: Veselý 18	Boxscore	Pts: Ibaka 13; Rebs: Ibaka 8 Asts: four players 2 PIR: Francisco 13	Arena: Palau Blaugrana; Attendance: 6,519; Referees: Tomislav Hordov, Eduard Udyanskyy, Uroš Obrknežević

20 October 2023	Virtus Segafredo Bologna (Italian Basketball Federation)	85–79	(Basketball Federation of Serbia) Crvena zvezda Meridianbet	Bologna
20:30 (CEST)	Scoring by quarter: 26–15, 18–18, 18–22, 23–24
	Pts: Shengelia 19; Rebs: Mickey 8 Asts: Cordinier 6 PIR: Cordinier 20	Boxscore	Pts: Napier 23; Rebs: Bolomboy 9 Asts: Napier 5 PIR: Napier 28	Arena: PalaDozza; Attendance: 5,345; Referees: Carlos Peruga, Igor Dragojević, Hugues Thépénier

=== Round 5 ===
26 October 2023	Partizan Mozzart Bet (Basketball Federation of Serbia)	88–86	(Basketball Federation of Serbia) Crvena zvezda Meridianbet	Belgrade
18:30 (CEST)	Scoring by quarter: 22–13, 20–29, 11–23, 35–21
	Pts: Avramović 14; Rebs: Kaminsky 5 Asts: Nunnally, LeDay 4 PIR: LeDay 20	Boxscore	Pts: Bolomboy 16; Rebs: Mitrović 8 Asts: Teodosić 6 PIR: Mitrović 19	Arena: Štark Arena; Attendance: 20,039; Referees: Miguel Ángel Pérez, Gytis Vilius, Rain Peerandi

26 October 2023	ALBA Berlin (German Basketball Federation)	85–82	(Italian Basketball Federation) EA7 Emporio Armani Milan	Berlin
20:00 (CEST)	Scoring by quarter: 12–18, 23–19, 22–24, 28–21
	Pts: Thiemann 22; Rebs: Delow 7 Asts: Spagnolo 6 PIR: Thiemann 30	Boxscore	Pts: Mirotić 30; Rebs: Mirotić 12; Asts: Hall 4 PIR: Mirotić 36	Arena: Mercedes-Benz Arena; Attendance: 9,113; Referees: Emilio Pérez, Igor Dragojević, Denis Hadžić

26 October 2023	Real Madrid (Spanish Basketball Federation)	65–64	(Spanish Basketball Federation) Barcelona	Madrid
20:45 (CEST)	Scoring by quarter: 12–19, 16–11, 23–11, 14–23
	Pts: Deck 20; Rebs: Hezonja 10; Asts: Campazzo 7 PIR: Deck 20	Boxscore	Pts: Hernangómez 13; Rebs: Veselý 10; Asts: Jokubaitis 4 PIR: Veselý 18	Arena: WiZink Center; Attendance: 11,432; Referees: Ilija Belošević, Milan Nedović, Luka Kardum

26 October 2023	Olympiacos (Hellenic Basketball Federation)	75–57	(Turkish Basketball Federation) Anadolu Efes	Piraeus
21:00 (CEST)	Scoring by quarter: 17–14, 16–11, 28–18, 14–14
	Pts: Papanikolaou, Williams-Goss 14; Rebs: three players 7 Asts: Walkup 6 PIR: Williams-Goss 20	Boxscore	Pts: Bryant 10; Rebs: Clyburn 9 Asts: Larkin 5 PIR: Bryant, Larkin 10	Arena: Peace and Friendship Stadium; Attendance: 12,197; Referees: Juan Carlos García, Mehdi Difallah, Miloš Koljenšić

26 October 2023	AS Monaco (French Federation of Basketball)	107–79	(Israeli Basketball Association) Maccabi Playtika Tel Aviv	Fontvieille
21:00 (CEST)	Scoring by quarter: 27–23, 25–15, 33–19, 22–22
	Pts: James 24; Rebs: J. Brown 8 Asts: Okobo 6 PIR: James 30	Boxscore	Pts: Cleveland, L. Brown 14; Rebs: Nebo 9 Asts: Blatt 8 PIR: Nebo 18	Arena: Salle Gaston Médecin; Attendance: 3,486; Referees: Carlos Peruga, Piotr Pastusiak, Artūras Šukys

27 October 2023	Žalgiris (Lithuanian Basketball Federation)	72–87	(Spanish Basketball Federation) Valencia Basket	Kaunas
19:00 (CEST)	Scoring by quarter: 12–20, 18–32, 23–20, 19–15
	Pts: Evans 18; Rebs: Šmits 6 Asts: Evans 4 PIR: Evans 27	Boxscore	Pts: Jones 16; Rebs: Toure 7 Asts: Jović 6 PIR: Jones 18	Arena: Žalgirio Arena; Attendance: 15,073; Referees: Emin Moğulkoç, Anne Panther, Hüseyin Çelik

27 October 2023	LDLC ASVEL (French Federation of Basketball)	84–87	(Italian Basketball Federation) Virtus Segafredo Bologna	Villeurbanne
20:00 (CEST)	Scoring by quarter: 18–21, 24–18, 21–26, 21–22
	Pts: Fall 16; Rebs: Fall 6 Asts: Lee 10; PIR: Fall 22	Boxscore	Pts: Cordinier 20; Rebs: Shengelia 5 Asts: Hackett 6 PIR: Shengelia 29	Arena: Astroballe; Attendance: 5,459; Referees: Saša Pukl, Jakub Zamojski, Leandro Lezcano

27 October 2023	Panathinaikos (Hellenic Basketball Federation)	95–81	(Spanish Basketball Federation) Baskonia	Marousi
20:15 (CEST)	Scoring by quarter: 24–22, 24–21, 22–23, 25–15
	Pts: Mitoglou, Lessort 23; Rebs: Lessort 14; Asts: Sloukas 7 PIR: Lessort 31	Boxscore	Pts: Howard 22; Rebs: Costello 9 Asts: Sedekerskis 4 PIR: Sedekerskis 23	Arena: OAKA Altion; Attendance: 8,371; Referees: Damir Javor, Tomislav Hordov, Maxime Boubert

27 October 2023	Bayern Munich (German Basketball Federation)	67–76	(Turkish Basketball Federation) Fenerbahçe Beko	Munich
20:30 (CEST)	Scoring by quarter: 20–19, 18–22, 9–14, 20–21
	Pts: Francisco 11; Rebs: Bonga, Ibaka 7 Asts: Francisco 5 PIR: Booker 16	Boxscore	Pts: Wilbekin 17; Rebs: four players 6 Asts: Wilbekin 5 PIR: Wilbekin 23	Arena: BMW Park; Attendance: 6,410; Referees: Oļegs Latiševs, Jordi Aliaga, Nick Van Den Broeck

=== Round 6 ===
2 November 2023	Crvena zvezda Meridianbet (Basketball Federation of Serbia)	74–68	(German Basketball Federation) Bayern Munich	Belgrade
18:30 (CET)	Scoring by quarter: 12–19, 21–16, 20–24, 21–9
	Pts: Teodosić 16; Rebs: Davidovac, Bolomboy 7 Asts: Teodosić 11; PIR: Teodosić 22	Boxscore	Pts: Edwards 16; Rebs: Booker 9 Asts: Bolmaro, Ibaka 4 PIR: Bolmaro 19	Arena: Štark Arena; Attendance: 18,130; Referees: Emilio Pérez, Michele Rossi, Sérgio Silva

2 November 2023	Fenerbahçe Beko (Turkish Basketball Federation)	79–77	(Hellenic Basketball Federation) Olympiacos	Istanbul
18:45 (CET)	Scoring by quarter: 29–14, 17–19, 12–24, 21–20
	Pts: Papagiannis 15; Rebs: Hayes-Davis 7 Asts: Calathes 5 PIR: Papagiannis 19	Boxscore	Pts: Peters 19; Rebs: Peters 6 Asts: Papanikolaou, Walkup 5 PIR: Peters 23	Arena: Ülker Sports and Event Hall; Attendance: 10,951; Referees: Fernando Rocha, Uroš Nikolić, Sašo Petek

2 November 2023	Žalgiris (Lithuanian Basketball Federation)	88–91	(French Federation of Basketball) LDLC ASVEL	Kaunas
19:00 (CET)	Scoring by quarter: 30–24, 26–26, 24–22, 8–19
	Pts: Dimša 21; Rebs: Evans 6 Asts: Evans 7 PIR: Evans 22	Boxscore	Pts: Luwawu-Cabarrot 19; Rebs: Luwawu-Cabarrot 6 Asts: de Colo 6 PIR: Luwawu-Cabarrot 26	Arena: Žalgirio Arena; Attendance: 14,848; Referees: Carmelo Paternicò, Seffi Shemmesh, Sébastien Clivaz

2 November 2023	Valencia Basket (Spanish Basketball Federation)	79–71	(German Basketball Federation) ALBA Berlin	Valencia
20:30 (CET)	Scoring by quarter: 15–14, 26–25, 15–15, 23–17
	Pts: Ojeleye 19; Rebs: Ojeleye 7 Asts: Jones 5 PIR: Ojeleye 25	Boxscore	Pts: Brown 19; Rebs: Olinde 7 Asts: Spagnolo 5 PIR: Brown 23	Arena: La Fonteta; Attendance: 6,351; Referees: Tomislav Hordov, Robert Vyklický, Eduard Udyanskyy

2 November 2023	EA7 Emporio Armani Milan (Italian Basketball Federation)	66–72	(French Federation of Basketball) AS Monaco	Assago
20:30 (CET)	Scoring by quarter: 18–13, 19–22, 11–17, 18–20
	Pts: Shields 17; Rebs: Mirotić 9 Asts: Lô, Shields 4 PIR: Mirotić 17	Boxscore	Pts: James 21; Rebs: James 5 Asts: James, Okobo 3 PIR: James 22	Arena: Mediolanum Forum; Attendance: 8,789; Referees: Juan Carlos García, Rain Peerandi, Mario Majkić

3 November 2023	Virtus Segafredo Bologna (Italian Basketball Federation)	93–81	(Turkish Basketball Federation) Anadolu Efes	Bologna
20:30 (CET)	Scoring by quarter: 20–18, 21–27, 28–17, 24–19
	Pts: Shengelia 19; Rebs: Dunston 6 Asts: Shengelia 6 PIR: Shengelia 30	Boxscore	Pts: Beaubois 17; Rebs: Willis 7 Asts: Beaubois 3 PIR: Beaubois 22	Arena: Segafredo Arena; Attendance: 7,539; Referees: Miguel Ángel Pérez, Saulius Račys, Dragan Porobić

3 November 2023	Baskonia (Spanish Basketball Federation)	84–83	(Basketball Federation of Serbia) Partizan Mozzart Bet	Vitoria-Gasteiz
20:30 (CET)	Scoring by quarter: 23–23, 25–19, 15–24, 21–17
	Pts: Moneke 16; Rebs: Sedekerskis, Miller-McIntyre 8 Asts: Miller-McIntyre 8 PIR: Sedekerskis 22	Boxscore	Pts: Nunnally 16; Rebs: Kaminsky 7 Asts: Kaminsky 5 PIR: Kaminsky 21	Arena: Buesa Arena; Attendance: 9,208; Referees: Robert Lottermoser, Milan Nedović, Jurgis Laurinavičius

3 November 2023	Barcelona (Spanish Basketball Federation)	80–72	(Hellenic Basketball Federation) Panathinaikos	Barcelona
20:30 (CET)	Scoring by quarter: 21–20, 24–13, 26–14, 9–25
	Pts: Parker 17; Rebs: Satoranský 7 Asts: Kalinić, Satoranský 3 PIR: Parker, Satoranský 17	Boxscore	Pts: Grant 15; Rebs: Mitoglou 6 Asts: Moraitis 4 PIR: Balcerowski 17	Arena: Palau Blaugrana; Attendance: 7,225; Referees: Sreten Radović, Oļegs Latiševs, Joseph Bissang

28 November 2023	Maccabi Playtika Tel Aviv (Israeli Basketball Association)	70–99	(Spanish Basketball Federation) Real Madrid	Belgrade (Note: From 24 October onwards, Maccabi Playtika Tel Aviv will play their home matches in Belgrade due to the inability to host matches in Israel as a result of the Gaza war until further notice.)
20:15 (CET)	Scoring by quarter: 21–36, 20–16, 15–22, 14–25
	Pts: Brown 16; Rebs: Nebo 9 Asts: Brown 9 PIR: Brown 24	Boxscore	Pts: Tavares 19; Rebs: Tavares 8 Asts: Campazzo 9 PIR: Tavares 24	Arena: Aleksandar Nikolić Hall; Attendance: 0 Referees: Matej Boltauzer, Mehdi Difallah, Ioannis Foufis
Note: The match was originally to be played on 2 November at 20:05 (21:05 IST), but was postponed and rescheduled due to the inability to host matches in Israel as a result of the Gaza war.

=== Round 7 ===
9 November 2023	Olympiacos (Hellenic Basketball Federation)	74–75	(Spanish Basketball Federation) Baskonia	Piraeus
18:15 (CET)	Scoring by quarter: 26–20, 9–30, 25–17, 14–8
	Pts: Canaan 23; Rebs: Peters 8 Asts: Fall 7 PIR: Peters, Fall 24	Boxscore	Pts: Moneke 20; Rebs: Sedekerskis 13; Asts: Sedekerskis 3 PIR: Moneke 28	Arena: Peace and Friendship Stadium; Attendance: 8,127; Referees: Ilija Belošević, Jakub Zamojski, Kristaps Konstantinovs

9 November 2023	Anadolu Efes (Turkish Basketball Federation)	86–82(OT)	(Lithuanian Basketball Federation) Žalgiris	Istanbul
18:30 (CET)	Scoring by quarter: 13–14, 25–12, 13–20, 23–28, Overtime: 12–8
	Pts: Clyburn 20; Rebs: Willis 10; Asts: Thompson, Larkin 5 PIR: Clyburn 28	Boxscore	Pts: Evans 20; Rebs: Šmits 7 Asts: Ulanovas 6 PIR: Hayes 22	Arena: Sinan Erdem Dome; Attendance: 10,938; Referees: Emilio Pérez, Carlos Cortés, Marko Juras

9 November 2023	Maccabi Playtika Tel Aviv (Israeli Basketball Association)	93–90	(German Basketball Federation) Bayern Munich	Belgrade
20:05 (CET)	Scoring by quarter: 17–19, 29–25, 25–19, 22–27
	Pts: Colson 19; Rebs: Nebo 6 Asts: Brown 7 PIR: Colson 22	Boxscore	Pts: Edwards 17; Rebs: three players 4 Asts: Bolmaro 5 PIR: Ibaka 16	Arena: Aleksandar Nikolić Hall; Attendance: 0 (Note: Maccabi Playtika Tel Aviv's home game against Bayern Munich was played behind closed doors for security reasons.); Referees: Saša Pukl, Tomasz Trawicki, Hüseyin Çelik

9 November 2023	Partizan Mozzart Bet (Basketball Federation of Serbia)	85–84	(Turkish Basketball Federation) Fenerbahçe Beko	Belgrade
20:30 (CET)	Scoring by quarter: 23–27, 24–29, 16–13, 22–15
	Pts: Kaminsky 15; Rebs: LeDay 7 Asts: Dozier, LeDay 5 PIR: Smailagić 15	Boxscore	Pts: Hayes-Davis 23; Rebs: Hayes, Papagiannis 6 Asts: Dorsey 5 PIR: Hayes 35	Arena: Štark Arena; Attendance: 20,058; Referees: Carlos Peruga, Marcin Kowalski, Thomas Bissuel

9 November 2023	EA7 Emporio Armani Milan (Italian Basketball Federation)	83–52	(Spanish Basketball Federation) Valencia Basket	Assago
20:30 (CET)	Scoring by quarter: 23–12, 21–19, 20–8, 19–13
	Pts: Mirotić 19; Rebs: Poythress, Mirotić 7 Asts: Lô 6 PIR: Mirotić 23	Boxscore	Pts: Harper 10; Rebs: Davies 7 Asts: Inglis 4 PIR: Inglis 12	Arena: Mediolanum Forum; Attendance: 8,656; Referees: Robert Lottermoser, Piotr Pastusiak, Noam Gordon

9 November 2023	Real Madrid (Spanish Basketball Federation)	100–74	(Italian Basketball Federation) Virtus Segafredo Bologna	Madrid
20:45 (CET)	Scoring by quarter: 26–27, 27–10, 15–14, 32–23
	Pts: Campazzo 18; Rebs: Tavares, Yabusele 7 Asts: Campazzo 11; PIR: Campazzo 39	Boxscore	Pts: Belinelli 15; Rebs: Shengelia 6 Asts: Pajola 7 PIR: Hackett 15	Arena: WiZink Center; Attendance: 8,693; Referees: Seffi Shemmesh, Miloš Koljenšić, Steve Bittner

10 November 2023	ALBA Berlin (German Basketball Federation)	85–99	(Hellenic Basketball Federation) Panathinaikos	Berlin
20:00 (CET)	Scoring by quarter: 26–27, 21–33, 23–22, 15–17
	Pts: Brown 17; Rebs: Thiemann 6 Asts: Delow, Samar 4 PIR: Thiemann 19	Boxscore	Pts: Mitoglou 24; Rebs: Mitoglou 10; Asts: Grant 9 PIR: Mitoglou 30	Arena: Mercedes-Benz Arena; Attendance: 13,247; Referees: Milan Nedović, Luka Kardum, Alberto Baena

10 November 2023	Barcelona (Spanish Basketball Federation)	86–81	(Basketball Federation of Serbia) Crvena zvezda Meridianbet	Barcelona
20:30 (CET)	Scoring by quarter: 21–18, 26–25, 18–19, 21–19
	Pts: Parker 20; Rebs: three players 5 Asts: Satoranský 6 PIR: Parker, Satoranský 19	Boxscore	Pts: Mitrović 22; Rebs: Bolomboy 9 Asts: Teodosić 9 PIR: Mitrović 19	Arena: Palau Blaugrana; Attendance: 5,473; Referees: Damir Javor, Carmelo Paternicò, Robert Vyklický

10 November 2023	AS Monaco (French Federation of Basketball)	80–70	(French Federation of Basketball) LDLC ASVEL	Fontvieille
21:00 (CET)	Scoring by quarter: 14–23, 27–14, 16–24, 23–9
	Pts: Diallo 21; Rebs: Diallo 9 Asts: Okobo, Loyd 4 PIR: Diallo 27	Boxscore	Pts: Luwawu-Cabarrot 18; Rebs: Fall 12; Asts: Lee 6 PIR: Luwawu-Cabarrot 17	Arena: Salle Gaston Médecin; Attendance: 4,221; Referees: Emin Moğulkoç, Gentian Cici, Guido Giovannetti

=== Round 8 ===
14 November 2023	AS Monaco (French Federation of Basketball)	82–89	(Turkish Basketball Federation) Anadolu Efes	Fontvieille
19:00 (CET)	Scoring by quarter: 25–28, 19–20, 22–21, 16–20
	Pts: Loyd 19; Rebs: Brown 8 Asts: James 4 PIR: Brown 23	Boxscore	Pts: Larkin 25; Rebs: Clyburn 6 Asts: three players 5 PIR: Larkin 25	Arena: Salle Gaston Médecin; Attendance: 3,436; Referees: Saša Pukl, Luka Kardum, Eduard Udyanskyy

14 November 2023	Maccabi Playtika Tel Aviv (Israeli Basketball Association)	74–79	(Hellenic Basketball Federation) Olympiacos	Belgrade
20:05 (CET)	Scoring by quarter: 19–27, 17–24, 19–13, 19–15
	Pts: Sorkin 16; Rebs: Colson 9 Asts: Brown 8 PIR: Sorkin 17	Boxscore	Pts: Peters, Walkup 13; Rebs: Peters 8 Asts: Fall, Walkup 4 PIR: Fall 15	Arena: Aleksandar Nikolić Hall; Attendance: 0 Referees: Robert Lottermoser, Saulius Račys, Rain Peerandi

14 November 2023	Virtus Segafredo Bologna (Italian Basketball Federation)	86–79	(Italian Basketball Federation) EA7 Emporio Armani Milan	Bologna
20:30 (CET)	Scoring by quarter: 21–26, 24–14, 20–23, 21–16
	Pts: Lundberg 19; Rebs: Shengelia 6 Asts: Hackett 7 PIR: Lundberg 28	Boxscore	Pts: Shields 21; Rebs: Mirotić 7 Asts: Lô 6 PIR: Shields 22	Arena: Segafredo Arena; Attendance: 7,983; Referees: Carlos Peruga, Artūras Šukys, Jordi Aliaga

14 November 2023	Valencia Basket (Spanish Basketball Federation)	73–76	(Spanish Basketball Federation) Real Madrid	Valencia
20:30 (CET)	Scoring by quarter: 26–24, 23–19, 13–20, 11–13
	Pts: Davies 22; Rebs: Davies 4 Asts: Jović 5 PIR: Davies 20	Boxscore	Pts: Deck 17; Rebs: Tavares 7 Asts: Campazzo 5 PIR: Campazzo 23	Arena: La Fonteta; Attendance: 7,997; Referees: Sreten Radović, Jurgis Laurinavičius, Aare Halliko

14 November 2023	Crvena zvezda Meridianbet (Basketball Federation of Serbia)	87–56	(Turkish Basketball Federation) Fenerbahçe Beko	Belgrade
20:45 (CET)	Scoring by quarter: 25–16, 20–10, 15–14, 27–16
	Pts: Teodosić 18; Rebs: Mitrović 8 Asts: Nedović 5 PIR: Teodosić 21	Boxscore	Pts: Hayes-Davis 12; Rebs: Sestina 5 Asts: Madar 3 PIR: Sestina 11	Arena: Štark Arena; Attendance: 19,637; Referees: Mehdi Difallah, Milan Nedović, Guido Giovannetti

15 November 2023	ALBA Berlin (German Basketball Federation)	68–73	(French Federation of Basketball) LDLC ASVEL	Berlin
20:00 (CET)	Scoring by quarter: 13–28, 22–15, 20–10, 13–20
	Pts: Thiemann 16; Rebs: Olinde, Thiemann 5 Asts: Delow, Thomas 4 PIR: Thiemann 21	Boxscore	Pts: Luwawu-Cabarrot 19; Rebs: Fall 11; Asts: Luwawu-Cabarrot, Lee 5 PIR: Luwawu-Cabarrot 24	Arena: Mercedes-Benz Arena; Attendance: 6,561; Referees: Milivoje Jovčić, Ioannis Foufis, Amit Balak

15 November 2023	Panathinaikos (Hellenic Basketball Federation)	73–71	(Lithuanian Basketball Federation) Žalgiris	Marousi
20:15 (CEST)	Scoring by quarter: 13–15, 23–24, 17–13, 20–19
	Pts: Mitoglou 19; Rebs: Mitoglou 6 Asts: Grant 5 PIR: Mitoglou 23	Boxscore	Pts: Šmits 15; Rebs: Butkevičius 8 Asts: Ulanovas, Evans 4 PIR: Butkevičius 13	Arena: OAKA Altion; Attendance: 11,125; Referees: Juan Carlos García, Miloš Koljenšić, Michele Rossi

15 November 2023	Baskonia (Spanish Basketball Federation)	94–71	(Spanish Basketball Federation) Barcelona	Vitoria-Gasteiz
20:30 (CET)	Scoring by quarter: 26–18, 29–11, 15–24, 24–18
	Pts: Howard 26; Rebs: Sedekerskis 12; Asts: Miller-McIntyre 7 PIR: Miller-McIntyre 29	Boxscore	Pts: Laprovíttola 14; Rebs: Parra 7 Asts: Laprovíttola, Brizuela 4 PIR: Laprovíttola, da Silva 14	Arena: Buesa Arena; Attendance: 10,033; Referees: Emin Moğulkoç, Sašo Petek, Maxime Boubert

15 November 2023	Bayern Munich (German Basketball Federation)	94–85	(Basketball Federation of Serbia) Partizan Mozzart Bet	Munich
20:30 (CET)	Scoring by quarter: 25–32, 28–19, 17–12, 24–22
	Pts: Edwards 21; Rebs: Booker 11; Asts: Francisco 6 PIR: Edwards 23	Boxscore	Pts: Caboclo 19; Rebs: Nunnally 8 Asts: Dozier 5 PIR: Caboclo 23	Arena: BMW Park; Attendance: 6,365; Referees: Fernando Rocha, Tomislav Hordov, Kristaps Konstantinovs

=== Round 9 ===
16 November 2023	Maccabi Playtika Tel Aviv (Israeli Basketball Association)	78–73	(Turkish Basketball Federation) Fenerbahçe Beko	Belgrade
20:05 (CET)	Scoring by quarter: 21–28, 17–18, 18–11, 22–16
	Pts: Brown 18; Rebs: Colson 14; Asts: Baldwin 5 PIR: Webb 18	Boxscore	Pts: Wilbekin, Biberović 18; Rebs: Hayes-Davis, Sestina 6 Asts: Wilbekin 7 PIR: Wilbekin 20	Arena: Aleksandar Nikolić Hall; Attendance: 0 Referees: Ilija Belošević, Joseph Bissang, Uroš Obrknežević
Note: The match was originally to be played at Ülker Sports and Event Hall in Istanbul, but was swapped with the reverse fixture due to Maccabi Playtika Tel Aviv's situation.

16 November 2023	Olympiacos (Hellenic Basketball Federation)	88–83	(Basketball Federation of Serbia) Crvena zvezda Meridianbet	Piraeus
20:15 (CET)	Scoring by quarter: 20–23, 25–21, 19–9, 24–30
	Pts: Peters 28; Rebs: Fall 14; Asts: Walkup 8 PIR: Peters 31	Boxscore	Pts: Nedović 26; Rebs: Mitrović 5 Asts: Nedović, Teodosić 4 PIR: Nedović 28	Arena: Peace and Friendship Stadium; Attendance: 10,962; Referees: Oļegs Latiševs, Tomasz Trawicki, Josip Radojković

16 November 2023	EA7 Emporio Armani Milan (Italian Basketball Federation)	92–76	(Turkish Basketball Federation) Anadolu Efes	Assago
20:30 (CET)	Scoring by quarter: 19–18, 24–21, 20–22, 29–15
	Pts: Shields 18; Rebs: Melli 10; Asts: Voigtmann 6 PIR: Melli 24	Boxscore	Pts: Clyburn 18; Rebs: Clyburn 7 Asts: Larkin 7 PIR: Clyburn 25	Arena: Mediolanum Forum; Attendance: 7,814; Referees: Sreten Radović, Uroš Nikolić, Robert Vyklický

16 November 2023	Real Madrid (Spanish Basketball Federation)	91–73	(French Federation of Basketball) AS Monaco	Madrid
20:45 (CET)	Scoring by quarter: 30–20, 23–19, 27–11, 11–23
	Pts: Musa 21; Rebs: Poirier 11; Asts: three players 5 PIR: Musa 29	Boxscore	Pts: Motiejūnas 14; Rebs: Hall 8 Asts: Okobo 6 PIR: Motiejūnas 17	Arena: WiZink Center; Attendance: 8,782; Referees: Damir Javor, Sérgio Silva, Vasiliki Tsaroucha

17 November 2023	Žalgiris (Lithuanian Basketball Federation)	74–73	(German Basketball Federation) Bayern Munich	Kaunas
19:00 (CET)	Scoring by quarter: 25–18, 16–25, 21–18, 12–12
	Pts: Šmits 16; Rebs: Birutis 9 Asts: Lekavičius, Ulanovas 3 PIR: Birutis 17	Boxscore	Pts: Ibaka 20; Rebs: Ibaka, Weiler-Babb 7 Asts: Weiler-Babb 5 PIR: Ibaka 22	Arena: Žalgirio Arena; Attendance: 15,034; Referees: Miguel Ángel Pérez, Marcin Kowalski, Alberto Baena

17 November 2023	LDLC ASVEL (French Federation of Basketball)	81–88	(Spanish Basketball Federation) Baskonia	Villeurbanne
20:00 (CET)	Scoring by quarter: 30–20, 19–22, 16–31, 16–15
	Pts: Scott 22; Rebs: Lauvergne 9 Asts: Luwawu-Cabarrot 8 PIR: Scott 17	Boxscore	Pts: Howard 35; Rebs: Moneke 13; Asts: Moneke, Chiozza 6 PIR: Moneke 35	Arena: Astroballe; Attendance: 5,414; Referees: Piotr Pastusiak, Anne Panther, Dragan Porobić

17 November 2023	Panathinaikos (Hellenic Basketball Federation)	90–76	(Italian Basketball Federation) Virtus Segafredo Bologna	Marousi
20:15 (CET)	Scoring by quarter: 21–15, 24–27, 17–21, 28–13
	Pts: Mitoglou 24; Rebs: Mitoglou 10; Asts: Grant 7 PIR: Mitoglou 30	Boxscore	Pts: Belinelli 20; Rebs: Shengelia 11; Asts: three players 3 PIR: Shengelia 23	Arena: OAKA Altion; Attendance: 14,532; Referees: Matej Boltauzer, Mehdi Difallah, Carlos Cortés

17 November 2023	Barcelona (Spanish Basketball Federation)	74–70	(Spanish Basketball Federation) Valencia Basket	Barcelona
20:30 (CET)	Scoring by quarter: 25–16, 12–17, 17–19, 20–18
	Pts: Veselý 17; Rebs: Parker 7 Asts: Laprovíttola 5 PIR: Veselý 20	Boxscore	Pts: Jones 15; Rebs: López-Arostegui 7 Asts: three players 2 PIR: López-Arostegui, Toure 10	Arena: Palau Blaugrana; Attendance: 5,128; Referees: Fernando Rocha, Igor Dragojević, Steve Bittner

17 November 2023	Partizan Mozzart Bet (Basketball Federation of Serbia)	89–74	(German Basketball Federation) ALBA Berlin	Belgrade
20:45 (CET)	Scoring by quarter: 18–20, 25–20, 22–15, 24–19
	Pts: Avramović 20; Rebs: Caboclo 5 Asts: Nunnally 6 PIR: Nunnally 21	Boxscore	Pts: Thiemann 21; Rebs: Koumadje 11; Asts: Delow 8 PIR: Thiemann 25	Arena: Štark Arena; Attendance: 18,912; Referees: Emilio Pérez, Jakub Zamojski, Maxime Boubert

=== Round 10 ===
23 November 2023	LDLC ASVEL (French Federation of Basketball)	100–101(OT)	(German Basketball Federation) Bayern Munich	Décines-Charpieu
20:00 (CET)	Scoring by quarter: 18–22, 22–15, 20–14, 14–23, Overtime: 14–14, 12–13
	Pts: Lauvergne, Scott 21; Rebs: Fall 8 Asts: Lee 7 PIR: Lee 24	Boxscore	Pts: Bolmaro, Booker 16; Rebs: Booker 11; Asts: Bolmaro 8 PIR: Bolmaro 22	Arena: LDLC Arena; Attendance: 11,354; Referees: Carlos Peruga, Emilio Pérez, Sébastien Clivaz

23 November 2023	Maccabi Playtika Tel Aviv (Israeli Basketball Association)	90–92	(Spanish Basketball Federation) Barcelona	Belgrade
20:05 (CET)	Scoring by quarter: 31–26, 20–25, 17–19, 22–22
	Pts: Baldwin 19; Rebs: Colson 7 Asts: Baldwin 8 PIR: Baldwin 22	Boxscore	Pts: Laprovíttola 23; Rebs: Hernangómez 8 Asts: Satoranský 4 PIR: Laprovíttola 19	Arena: Aleksandar Nikolić Hall; Attendance: 0 Referees: Mehdi Difallah, Milan Nedović, Hugues Thépénier

23 November 2023	Panathinaikos AKTOR (Hellenic Basketball Federation)	90–73	(Spanish Basketball Federation) Valencia Basket	Marousi
20:15 (CET)	Scoring by quarter: 27–18, 22–17, 23–18, 18–20
	Pts: Lessort 17; Rebs: Lessort 7 Asts: Sloukas 9 PIR: Lessort 28	Boxscore	Pts: Ojeleye 16; Rebs: Inglis 5 Asts: Jones 10; PIR: Ojeleye 23	Arena: OAKA Altion; Attendance: 13,809; Referees: Ilija Belošević, Seffi Shemmesh, Gytis Vilius

23 November 2023	Virtus Segafredo Bologna (Italian Basketball Federation)	87–79	(Turkish Basketball Federation) Fenerbahçe Beko	Bologna
20:30 (CET)	Scoring by quarter: 25–27, 21–17, 24–14, 17–21
	Pts: Shengelia 15; Rebs: Shengelia 8 Asts: Hackett 6 PIR: Shengelia 21	Boxscore	Pts: Motley 25; Rebs: Motley 8 Asts: Calathes, Gudurić 4 PIR: Motley 31	Arena: Segafredo Arena; Attendance: 7,250; Referees: Juan Carlos García, Milivoje Jovčić, Amit Balak

23 November 2023	Real Madrid (Spanish Basketball Federation)	99–75	(German Basketball Federation) ALBA Berlin	Madrid
20:45 (CET)	Scoring by quarter: 27–17, 17–16, 23–18, 32–24
	Pts: Hezonja 26; Rebs: Tavares 6 Asts: Campazzo 13; PIR: Hezonja 25	Boxscore	Pts: Procida 14; Rebs: Koumadje 8 Asts: Samar 5 PIR: Procida, Thiemann 15	Arena: WiZink Center; Attendance: 6,866; Referees: Saša Pukl, Carmelo Paternicò, Vassilis Pitsilkas

24 November 2023	Anadolu Efes (Turkish Basketball Federation)	100–94	(Basketball Federation of Serbia) Partizan Mozzart Bet	Istanbul
18:30 (CET)	Scoring by quarter: 22–22, 28–23, 14–29, 36–20
	Pts: Larkin 27; Rebs: three players 3 Asts: Larkin 8 PIR: Larkin 38	Boxscore	Pts: Kaminsky 24; Rebs: Nunnally 8 Asts: Dozier, Jaramaz 5 PIR: Nunnally 23	Arena: Sinan Erdem Dome; Attendance: 10,507; Referees: Miguel Ángel Pérez, Joseph Bissang, Igor Dragojević

24 November 2023	Olympiacos (Hellenic Basketball Federation)	89–72	(Lithuanian Basketball Federation) Žalgiris	Piraeus
20:15 (CET)	Scoring by quarter: 19–19, 24–12, 26–21, 20–20
	Pts: Canaan 25; Rebs: Brazdeikis, Peters 6 Asts: Walkup 5 PIR: Peters 29	Boxscore	Pts: Evans 21; Rebs: Hayes, Šmits 5 Asts: Lekavičius 3 PIR: Evans 21	Arena: Peace and Friendship Stadium; Attendance: 12,229; Referees: Damir Javor, Uroš Nikolić, Gentian Cici

24 November 2023	Baskonia (Spanish Basketball Federation)	75–77	(French Federation of Basketball) AS Monaco	Vitoria-Gasteiz
20:30 (CET)	Scoring by quarter: 19–16, 17–19, 23–27, 16–15
	Pts: Howard 18; Rebs: Miller-McIntyre 8 Asts: Chiozza, Costello 4 PIR: Sedekerskis 19	Boxscore	Pts: James 28; Rebs: James, Brown 8 Asts: James 5 PIR: James 29	Arena: Buesa Arena; Attendance: 11,284; Referees: Robert Lottermoser, Tomislav Hordov, Uroš Obrknežević

24 November 2023	Crvena zvezda Meridianbet (Basketball Federation of Serbia)	71–93	(Italian Basketball Federation) EA7 Emporio Armani Milan	Belgrade
20:30 (CET)	Scoring by quarter: 19–20, 20–18, 17–25, 15–30
	Pts: Davidovac 18; Rebs: Davidovac 6 Asts: Teodosić 4 PIR: Mitrović, Davidovac 23	Boxscore	Pts: Lô 32; Rebs: three players 5 Asts: Lô 3 PIR: Lô 38	Arena: Štark Arena; Attendance: 19,854; Referees: Emin Moğulkoç, Ioannis Foufis, Saulius Račys

=== Round 11 ===
30 November 2023	Fenerbahçe Beko (Turkish Basketball Federation)	100–99(OT)	(Spanish Basketball Federation) Real Madrid	Istanbul
18:45 (CET)	Scoring by quarter: 16–29, 21–15, 22–23, 28–20, Overtime: 13–12
	Pts: Gudurić 21; Rebs: Hayes-Davis, Gudurić 7 Asts: Gudurić 5 PIR: Gudurić 29	Boxscore	Pts: Campazzo 33; Rebs: Deck, Poirier 8 Asts: Campazzo 7 PIR: Campazzo 32	Arena: Ülker Sports and Event Hall; Attendance: 11,787; Referees: Robert Lottermoser, Miloš Koljenšić, Luka Kardum

30 November 2023	AS Monaco (French Federation of Basketball)	85–77	(Hellenic Basketball Federation) Olympiacos	Fontvieille
19:00 (CET)	Scoring by quarter: 22–17, 16–22, 20–20, 27–18
	Pts: James 24; Rebs: Hall 6 Asts: James 6 PIR: James 28	Boxscore	Pts: Canaan 20; Rebs: Milutinov, Fall 5 Asts: Canaan 4 PIR: Canaan 17	Arena: Salle Gaston Médecin; Attendance: 4,269; Referees: Carlos Peruga, Piotr Pastusiak, Artūras Šukys

30 November 2023	Maccabi Playtika Tel Aviv (Israeli Basketball Association)	102–81	(German Basketball Federation) ALBA Berlin	Belgrade
20:05 (CET)	Scoring by quarter: 29–14, 29–28, 23–24, 21–15
	Pts: Baldwin 18; Rebs: Rivero, Menco 5 Asts: three players 6 PIR: Baldwin 25	Boxscore	Pts: Procida 22; Rebs: Koumadje 7 Asts: four players 3 PIR: Procida 19	Arena: Aleksandar Nikolić Hall; Attendance: 0 Referees: Miguel Ángel Pérez, Damir Javor, Josip Radojković

30 November 2023	EA7 Emporio Armani Milan (Italian Basketball Federation)	70–83	(Lithuanian Basketball Federation) Žalgiris	Assago
20:30 (CET)	Scoring by quarter: 19–18, 12–23, 21–18, 18–24
	Pts: Shields 21; Rebs: Voigtmann, Melli 5 Asts: Lô 4 PIR: Shields 21	Boxscore	Pts: Ulanovas 20; Rebs: Ulanovas 6 Asts: Ulanovas 5 PIR: Ulanovas 32	Arena: Mediolanum Forum; Attendance: 9,608; Referees: Ilija Belošević, Milivoje Jovčić, Hüseyin Çelik

30 November 2023	Bayern Munich (German Basketball Federation)	90–76	(Italian Basketball Federation) Virtus Segafredo Bologna	Munich
20:30 (CET)	Scoring by quarter: 20–28, 24–18, 26–20, 20–10
	Pts: Ibaka 24; Rebs: Ibaka 13; Asts: Francisco, Edwards 5 PIR: Ibaka 34	Boxscore	Pts: Belinelli 22; Rebs: Dunston 8 Asts: Hackett 5 PIR: Belinelli 17	Arena: BMW Park; Attendance: 6,264; Referees: Sreten Radović, Jakub Zamojski, Saulius Račys

30 November 2023	Partizan Mozzart Bet (Basketball Federation of Serbia)	92–87(OT)	(Hellenic Basketball Federation) Panathinaikos AKTOR	Belgrade
20:45 (CET)	Scoring by quarter: 20–21, 19–17, 15–18, 24–22, Overtime: 14–9
	Pts: LeDay 23; Rebs: Anđušić 8 Asts: Dozier 4 PIR: LeDay 24	Boxscore	Pts: Nunn 19; Rebs: Mitoglou 7 Asts: Sloukas, Grant 5 PIR: Nunn 18	Arena: Štark Arena; Attendance: 20,079; Referees: Emin Moğulkoç, Oļegs Latiševs, Jordi Aliaga

1 December 2023	Crvena zvezda Meridianbet (Basketball Federation of Serbia)	97–83	(Turkish Basketball Federation) Anadolu Efes	Belgrade
20:00 (CET)	Scoring by quarter: 22–21, 21–28, 29–21, 25–13
	Pts: Nedović 23; Rebs: Mitrović 7 Asts: dos Santos 5 PIR: dos Santos 28	Boxscore	Pts: Larkin 21; Rebs: Jones 10; Asts: Larkin 5 PIR: Larkin 19	Arena: Štark Arena; Attendance: 18,290; Referees: Carmelo Paternicò, Carlos Cortés, Alberto Baena

1 December 2023	Valencia Basket (Spanish Basketball Federation)	84–98	(Spanish Basketball Federation) Baskonia	Valencia
20:30 (CET)	Scoring by quarter: 21–20, 31–24, 18–23, 14–31
	Pts: Ojeleye 16; Rebs: Inglis, Toure 6 Asts: Harper 4 PIR: Jones, Ojeleye 13	Boxscore	Pts: Howard 24; Rebs: Moneke 7 Asts: Miller-McIntyre 10; PIR: Moneke 27	Arena: La Fonteta; Attendance: 6,617; Referees: Matej Boltauzer, Mehdi Difallah, Gentian Cici

1 December 2023	Barcelona (Spanish Basketball Federation)	101–92	(French Federation of Basketball) LDLC ASVEL	Barcelona
20:30 (CET)	Scoring by quarter: 28–24, 22–23, 28–24, 23–21
	Pts: Laprovíttola 28; Rebs: Parker 6 Asts: Laprovíttola 9 PIR: Laprovíttola 31	Boxscore	Pts: Luwawu-Cabarrot 20; Rebs: Fall 7 Asts: Lee 7 PIR: Luwawu-Cabarrot 21	Arena: Palau Blaugrana; Attendance: 4,612; Referees: Tomislav Hordov, Gytis Vilius, Robert Vyklický

=== Round 12 ===
5 December 2023	Anadolu Efes (Turkish Basketball Federation)	71–68	(Hellenic Basketball Federation) Panathinaikos AKTOR	Istanbul
18:30 (CET)	Scoring by quarter: 23–15, 14–16, 13–21, 21–16
	Pts: Jones 21; Rebs: Jones 13; Asts: Thompson 6 PIR: Jones 36	Boxscore	Pts: Nunn, Lessort 13; Rebs: Nunn, Mitoglou 5 Asts: Sloukas 8 PIR: Grant, Lessort 15	Arena: Sinan Erdem Dome; Attendance: 14,016; Referees: Sreten Radović, Carlos Peruga, Rain Peerandi

5 December 2023	ALBA Berlin (German Basketball Federation)	64–62	(Lithuanian Basketball Federation) Žalgiris	Berlin
20:00 (CET)	Scoring by quarter: 13–20, 12–8, 14–17, 25–17
	Pts: Thiemann 16; Rebs: Wetzell, Thiemann 6 Asts: Spagnolo 3 PIR: Thiemann 17	Boxscore	Pts: Giedraitis 15; Rebs: Šmits 7 Asts: Šmits, Ulanovas 3 PIR: Giedraitis 18	Arena: Mercedes-Benz Arena; Attendance: 5,566; Referees: Emin Moğulkoç, Jakub Zamojski, Noam Gordon

5 December 2023	Olympiacos (Hellenic Basketball Federation)	71–77	(Spanish Basketball Federation) Real Madrid	Piraeus
20:15 (CET)	Scoring by quarter: 19–23, 17–14, 21–24, 14–16
	Pts: Walkup 17; Rebs: Peters 7 Asts: Walkup 4 PIR: Peters 16	Boxscore	Pts: Musa 23; Rebs: Hezonja 10; Asts: Campazzo 9 PIR: Musa, Hezonja 21	Arena: Peace and Friendship Stadium; Attendance: 12,239; Referees: Ilija Belošević, Tomislav Hordov, Michele Rossi

5 December 2023	Partizan Mozzart Bet (Basketball Federation of Serbia)	89–85(OT)	(French Federation of Basketball) AS Monaco	Belgrade
20:30 (CET)	Scoring by quarter: 16–13, 16–22, 19–16, 21–21, Overtime: 17–13
	Pts: Punter 25; Rebs: Caboclo 6 Asts: Dozier 7 PIR: Nunnally 25	Boxscore	Pts: Motiejūnas 23; Rebs: James 8 Asts: James 8 PIR: Motiejūnas 20	Arena: Štark Arena; Attendance: 19,974; Referees: Juan Carlos García, Matej Boltauzer, Guido Giovannetti

5 December 2023	Bayern Munich (German Basketball Federation)	91–84(OT)	(Italian Basketball Federation) EA7 Emporio Armani Milan	Munich
20:30 (CET)	Scoring by quarter: 22–25, 22–14, 11–13, 21–24, Overtime: 15–8
	Pts: Edwards 32; Rebs: Ibaka 12; Asts: Francisco 4 PIR: Edwards, Ibaka 28	Boxscore	Pts: Shields 26; Rebs: Poythress 4 Asts: Lô, Voigtmann 3 PIR: Shields 27	Arena: BMW Park; Attendance: 6,245; Referees: Saša Pukl, Uroš Obrknežević, Sašo Petek

6 December 2023	LDLC ASVEL (French Federation of Basketball)	91–94	(Israeli Basketball Association) Maccabi Playtika Tel Aviv	Villeurbanne
20:15 (CET)	Scoring by quarter: 19–17, 27–28, 20–25, 25–24
	Pts: Lauvergne 23; Rebs: Lauvergne 9 Asts: Lee 6 PIR: Lauvergne 28	Boxscore	Pts: Baldwin 21; Rebs: Sorkin 8 Asts: Baldwin 8 PIR: Baldwin 27	Arena: Astroballe; Attendance: 4,370; Referees: Jordi Aliaga, Milivoje Jovčić, Aare Halliko

6 December 2023	Virtus Segafredo Bologna (Italian Basketball Federation)	80–75	(Spanish Basketball Federation) Barcelona	Bologna
20:30 (CET)	Scoring by quarter: 18–24, 15–21, 23–16, 24–14
	Pts: Lundberg 21; Rebs: Shengelia 9 Asts: Hackett 6 PIR: Lundberg 21	Boxscore	Pts: Hernangómez 15; Rebs: Veselý 6 Asts: Laprovíttola 8 PIR: Hernangómez 18	Arena: Segafredo Arena; Attendance: 8,299; Referees: Robert Lottermoser, Ioannis Foufis, Maxime Boubert

6 December 2023	Valencia Basket (Spanish Basketball Federation)	85–81	(Basketball Federation of Serbia) Crvena zvezda Meridianbet	Valencia
20:30 (CET)	Scoring by quarter: 25–19, 31–21, 16–25, 13–16
	Pts: Davies 21; Rebs: Ojeleye 6 Asts: Harper 5 PIR: Ojeleye 24	Boxscore	Pts: Nedović, Napier 14; Rebs: Bolomboy 7 Asts: Teodosić 9 PIR: Teodosić 20	Arena: La Fonteta; Attendance: 6,817; Referees: Artūras Šukys, Damir Javor, Josip Radojković

6 December 2023	Baskonia (Spanish Basketball Federation)	80–79	(Turkish Basketball Federation) Fenerbahçe Beko	Vitoria-Gasteiz
20:30 (CET)	Scoring by quarter: 10–18, 28–19, 19–18, 23–24
	Pts: Howard 28; Rebs: Kotsar 10; Asts: Miller-McIntyre, Moneke 4 PIR: Kotsar 24	Boxscore	Pts: Hayes-Davis 19; Rebs: Pierre 5 Asts: Hayes 6 PIR: Hayes 23	Arena: Buesa Arena; Attendance: 10,452; Referees: Fernando Rocha, Joseph Bissang, Igor Dragojević

=== Round 13 ===
7 December 2023	ALBA Berlin (German Basketball Federation)	89–97	(Turkish Basketball Federation) Anadolu Efes	Berlin
20:00 (CET)	Scoring by quarter: 15–22, 25–15, 25–27, 24–33
	Pts: Thiemann 31; Rebs: Schneider 7 Asts: Spagnolo 5 PIR: Thiemann 40	Boxscore	Pts: Larkin 32; Rebs: Osmani 6 Asts: Hollatz, Thompson 8 PIR: Larkin 41	Arena: Mercedes-Benz Arena; Attendance: 7,116; Referees: Juan Carlos García, Jurgis Laurinavičius, Leandro Lezcano

7 December 2023	Panathinaikos AKTOR (Hellenic Basketball Federation)	78–90	(Spanish Basketball Federation) Real Madrid	Marousi
20:15 (CET)	Scoring by quarter: 23–24, 22–22, 10–26, 23–18
	Pts: Nunn 24; Rebs: Mitoglou 9 Asts: Vildoza, Nunn 4 PIR: Lessort 20	Boxscore	Pts: Hezonja 19; Rebs: Tavares 9 Asts: Campazzo 6 PIR: Hezonja 23	Arena: OAKA Altion; Attendance: 18,005; Referees: Mehdi Difallah, Saulius Račys, Gentian Cici

7 December 2023	Partizan Mozzart Bet (Basketball Federation of Serbia)	82–69	(Italian Basketball Federation) EA7 Emporio Armani Milan	Belgrade
20:30 (CET)	Scoring by quarter: 20–25, 19–19, 22–18, 21–7
	Pts: Punter 19; Rebs: Smailagić 6 Asts: Dozier 4 PIR: Punter 22	Boxscore	Pts: Shields 19; Rebs: Melli 6 Asts: Lô 5 PIR: Shields 19	Arena: Štark Arena; Attendance: 20,033; Referees: Sreten Radović, Carlos Cortés, Mario Majkić

8 December 2023	Žalgiris (Lithuanian Basketball Federation)	79–83	(French Federation of Basketball) AS Monaco	Kaunas
19:00 (CET)	Scoring by quarter: 19–23, 18–23, 22–11, 20–26
	Pts: Dimša 14; Rebs: Šmits 11; Asts: Evans 7 PIR: Šmits 20	Boxscore	Pts: James 25; Rebs: James 8 Asts: Okobo, Diallo 4 PIR: James 26	Arena: Žalgirio Arena; Attendance: 14,847; Referees: Miguel Ángel Pérez, Oļegs Latiševs, Anne Panther

8 December 2023	Olympiacos (Hellenic Basketball Federation)	77–69	(German Basketball Federation) Bayern Munich	Piraeus
20:15 (CET)	Scoring by quarter: 24–8, 17–21, 13–15, 23–25
	Pts: Peters, Walkup 14; Rebs: Peters 7 Asts: Walkup 7 PIR: Walkup 21	Boxscore	Pts: Edwards 11; Rebs: three players 5 Asts: Francisco 5 PIR: Booker 11	Arena: Peace and Friendship Stadium; Attendance: 11,457; Referees: Matej Boltauzer, Jordi Aliaga, Igor Dragojević

8 December 2023	Virtus Segafredo Bologna (Italian Basketball Federation)	100–90	(Israeli Basketball Association) Maccabi Playtika Tel Aviv	Bologna
20:30 (CET)	Scoring by quarter: 28–29, 21–20, 29–23, 22–18
	Pts: Shengelia 27; Rebs: Shengelia 8 Asts: Hackett 8 PIR: Shengelia 34	Boxscore	Pts: Brown 26; Rebs: Nebo 9 Asts: Brown, Blatt 5 PIR: Brown 32	Arena: Segafredo Arena; Attendance: 9,270; Referees: Fernando Rocha, Piotr Pastusiak, Gytis Vilius

8 December 2023	Baskonia (Spanish Basketball Federation)	87–85	(Basketball Federation of Serbia) Crvena zvezda Meridianbet	Vitoria-Gasteiz
20:30 (CET)	Scoring by quarter: 26–18, 26–25, 15–19, 20–23
	Pts: Sedekerskis 18; Rebs: Moneke 9 Asts: Miller-McIntyre 12; PIR: Sedekerskis 24	Boxscore	Pts: Giedraitis 24; Rebs: Mitrović 16; Asts: Mitrović 7 PIR: Giedraitis, Mitrović 24	Arena: Buesa Arena; Attendance: 10,470; Referees: Jakub Zamojski, Robert Vyklický, Steve Bittner

8 December 2023	Barcelona (Spanish Basketball Federation)	89–81	(Turkish Basketball Federation) Fenerbahçe Beko	Barcelona
20:30 (CET)	Scoring by quarter: 16–19, 22–31, 25–14, 26–17
	Pts: Hernangómez 21; Rebs: Hernangómez 9 Asts: Satoranský 6 PIR: Hernangómez 26	Boxscore	Pts: Hayes-Davis 18; Rebs: Pierre 6 Asts: Dorsey 7 PIR: Dorsey 18	Arena: Palau Blaugrana; Attendance: 6,787; Referees: Damir Javor, Milivoje Jovčić, Artūras Šukys

8 December 2023	LDLC ASVEL (French Federation of Basketball)	55–78	(Spanish Basketball Federation) Valencia Basket	Décines-Charpieu
21:00 (CET)	Scoring by quarter: 23–18, 10–17, 8–18, 14–25
	Pts: Lauvergne 13; Rebs: Lauvergne 8 Asts: Lee 7 PIR: Lauvergne 16	Boxscore	Pts: Ojeleye 16; Rebs: Inglis 8 Asts: Jones 5 PIR: Ojeleye, Inglis 16	Arena: LDLC Arena; Attendance: 7,674; Referees: Saša Pukl, Miloš Koljenšić, Vasiliki Tsaroucha

=== Round 14 ===
14 December 2023	Crvena zvezda Meridianbet (Basketball Federation of Serbia)	85–71	(German Basketball Federation) ALBA Berlin	Belgrade
19:00 (CET)	Scoring by quarter: 25–22, 26–20, 20–11, 14–18
	Pts: Nedović 20; Rebs: Bolomboy 6 Asts: Teodosić, Nedović 5 PIR: Nedović 24	Boxscore	Pts: Olinde 13; Rebs: Delow 7 Asts: Delow 9 PIR: Delow 15	Arena: Štark Arena; Attendance: 17,993; Referees: Fernando Rocha, Carlos Peruga, Marcin Kowalski

14 December 2023	Žalgiris (Lithuanian Basketball Federation)	85–93	(Basketball Federation of Serbia) Partizan Mozzart Bet	Kaunas
19:00 (CET)	Scoring by quarter: 21–29, 23–29, 20–18, 21–17
	Pts: Evans 33; Rebs: Lavrinovičius 8 Asts: Dimša, Evans 4 PIR: Evans 38	Boxscore	Pts: Punter 22; Rebs: three players 7 Asts: Dozier 4 PIR: Dozier 27	Arena: Žalgirio Arena; Attendance: 14,705; Referees: Saša Pukl, Emilio Pérez, Nick Van Den Broeck

14 December 2023	Maccabi Playtika Tel Aviv (Israeli Basketball Association)	95–86	(Turkish Basketball Federation) Anadolu Efes	Belgrade
20:05 (CET)	Scoring by quarter: 29–20, 16–28, 21–16, 29–22
	Pts: Brown 21; Rebs: Nebo 9 Asts: Blatt 6 PIR: Colson 26	Boxscore	Pts: Thompson 22; Rebs: Jones 16; Asts: Thompson 7 PIR: Thompson 26	Arena: Aleksandar Nikolić Hall; Attendance: 0 Referees: Miguel Ángel Pérez, Tomasz Trawicki, Uroš Obrknežević
Note: The match was originally to be played at Sinan Erdem Dome in Istanbul, but was swapped with the reverse fixture due to Maccabi Playtika Tel Aviv's situation.

14 December 2023	Baskonia (Spanish Basketball Federation)	81–91	(Italian Basketball Federation) Virtus Segafredo Bologna	Vitoria-Gasteiz
20:30 (CET)	Scoring by quarter: 15–24, 28–18, 17–21, 21–28
	Pts: Moneke 16; Rebs: Miller-McIntyre, Moneke 8 Asts: Miller-McIntyre 13; PIR: Moneke 26	Boxscore	Pts: Belinelli 27; Rebs: Cordinier, Hackett 8 Asts: Pajola 6 PIR: Shengelia 20	Arena: Buesa Arena; Attendance: 8,516; Referees: Oļegs Latiševs, Uroš Nikolić, Denis Hadžić

14 December 2023	Real Madrid (Spanish Basketball Federation)	88–73	(German Basketball Federation) Bayern Munich	Madrid
20:45 (CET)	Scoring by quarter: 19–23, 23–14, 21–20, 25–16
	Pts: Llull 16; Rebs: Poirier 9 Asts: Campazzo 3 PIR: Poirier 20	Boxscore	Pts: Bonga 15; Rebs: Bonga 5 Asts: Bolmaro 3 PIR: Bonga 18	Arena: WiZink Center; Attendance: 8,417; Referees: Milan Nedović, Luka Kardum, Adar Peer

14 December 2023	LDLC ASVEL (French Federation of Basketball)	81–89	(Hellenic Basketball Federation) Panathinaikos AKTOR	Décines-Charpieu
21:00 (CET)	Scoring by quarter: 21–24, 15–21, 24–19, 21–25
	Pts: Luwawu-Cabarrot 17; Rebs: Lauvergne 11; Asts: de Colo 8 PIR: Lauvergne 16	Boxscore	Pts: Grigonis 19; Rebs: Mitoglou 11; Asts: Sloukas 12; PIR: Sloukas 29	Arena: LDLC Arena; Attendance: 7,774; Referees: Matej Boltauzer, Carmelo Paternicò, Alberto Baena

15 December 2023	Fenerbahçe Beko (Turkish Basketball Federation)	86–74	(French Federation of Basketball) AS Monaco	Istanbul
18:45 (CET)	Scoring by quarter: 24–21, 22–24, 22–12, 18–17
	Pts: Hayes-Davis 23; Rebs: Calathes 10; Asts: Wilbekin 5 PIR: Hayes 25	Boxscore	Pts: James 24; Rebs: Blossomgame 7 Asts: Okobo 4 PIR: James 25	Arena: Ülker Sports and Event Hall; Attendance: 9,563; Referees: Tomislav Hordov, Gytis Vilius, Michele Rossi

15 December 2023	Olympiacos (Hellenic Basketball Federation)	56–63	(Spanish Basketball Federation) Valencia Basket	Piraeus
20:15 (CET)	Scoring by quarter: 15–14, 11–21, 12–12, 18–16
	Pts: Walkup 13; Rebs: Fall 7 Asts: Papanikolaou 4 PIR: Fall 19	Boxscore	Pts: Jones, Jović 12; Rebs: Davies, Toure 6 Asts: Jones 3 PIR: Jović 16	Arena: Peace and Friendship Stadium; Attendance: 10,898; Referees: Sreten Radović, Joseph Bissang, Sérgio Silva

15 December 2023	Barcelona (Spanish Basketball Federation)	86–90	(Italian Basketball Federation) EA7 Emporio Armani Milan	Barcelona
20:30 (CET)	Scoring by quarter: 19–29, 21–22, 19–17, 27–22
	Pts: Kalinić 17; Rebs: Hernangómez 6 Asts: Laprovíttola 5 PIR: Veselý 19	Boxscore	Pts: Hall 21; Rebs: Melli 6 Asts: Melli 3 PIR: Melli 24	Arena: Palau Blaugrana; Attendance: 4,588; Referees: Ilija Belošević, Anne Panther, Kristaps Konstantinovs

=== Round 15 ===
19 December 2023	Crvena zvezda Meridianbet (Basketball Federation of Serbia)	58–72	(Spanish Basketball Federation) Real Madrid	Belgrade
19:00 (CET)	Scoring by quarter: 20–20, 14–25, 11–16, 13–11
	Pts: Mitrović, Teodosić 14; Rebs: Bolomboy 10; Asts: Teodosić 5 PIR: Teodosić 18	Boxscore	Pts: Hezonja 17; Rebs: Hezonja 10; Asts: Rodríguez 8 PIR: Hezonja 19	Arena: Štark Arena; Attendance: 19,714; Referees: Emin Moğulkoç, Tomasz Trawicki, Sérgio Silva

19 December 2023	ALBA Berlin (German Basketball Federation)	74–70	(Spanish Basketball Federation) Barcelona	Berlin
20:00 (CET)	Scoring by quarter: 19–22, 19–19, 18–11, 18–18
	Pts: Thomas 13; Rebs: Koumadje, Thiemann 7 Asts: Delow 6 PIR: Thiemann 14	Boxscore	Pts: Laprovíttola 15; Rebs: Satoranský 10; Asts: three players 4 PIR: Satoranský 14	Arena: Mercedes-Benz Arena; Attendance: 10,592; Referees: Gytis Vilius, Saulius Račys, Guido Giovannetti

19 December 2023	Maccabi Playtika Tel Aviv (Israeli Basketball Association)	89–81	(Spanish Basketball Federation) Baskonia	Belgrade
20:05 (CET)	Scoring by quarter: 22–22, 25–27, 21–18, 21–14
	Pts: Webb, Nebo 17; Rebs: Nebo 11; Asts: Brown 8 PIR: Nebo 25	Boxscore	Pts: Howard 19; Rebs: Sedekerskis 11; Asts: Miller-McIntyre 8 PIR: Sedekerskis 25	Arena: Aleksandar Nikolić Hall; Attendance: 0 Referees: Matej Boltauzer, Milivoje Jovčić, Vasiliki Tsaroucha

19 December 2023	Virtus Segafredo Bologna (Italian Basketball Federation)	69–67	(Hellenic Basketball Federation) Olympiacos	Bologna
20:30 (CET)	Scoring by quarter: 17–19, 11–21, 19–15, 22–12
	Pts: Cordinier 13; Rebs: Shengelia 9 Asts: Hackett 6 PIR: Hackett 13	Boxscore	Pts: Larentzakis 13; Rebs: Milutinov 11; Asts: Williams-Goss 7 PIR: Milutinov 19	Arena: Segafredo Arena; Attendance: 7,725; Referees: Damir Javor, Carlos Peruga, Milan Nedović

19 December 2023	Valencia Basket (Spanish Basketball Federation)	67–72	(Basketball Federation of Serbia) Partizan Mozzart Bet	Valencia
21:00 (CET)	Scoring by quarter: 14–19, 20–14, 10–20, 23–19
	Pts: Jones 14; Rebs: Inglis 7 Asts: Davies, Jones 4 PIR: Jones 16	Boxscore	Pts: LeDay, Nunnally 14; Rebs: Punter 9 Asts: Punter, Nunnally 3 PIR: Punter 25	Arena: La Fonteta; Attendance: 7,184; Referees: Fernando Rocha, Piotr Pastusiak, Leandro Lezcano

20 December 2023	Fenerbahçe Beko (Turkish Basketball Federation)	80–78	(Lithuanian Basketball Federation) Žalgiris	Istanbul
18:30 (CET)	Scoring by quarter: 22–26, 15–22, 19–14, 24–16
	Pts: Dorsey 19; Rebs: Pierre 8 Asts: Calathes 6 PIR: Dorsey 24	Boxscore	Pts: Evans 19; Rebs: Šmits 9 Asts: Evans, Ulanovas 5 PIR: Evans 30	Arena: Ülker Sports and Event Hall; Attendance: 8,114; Referees: Juan Carlos García, Rain Peerandi, Thomas Bissuel

20 December 2023	AS Monaco (French Federation of Basketball)	90–91	(Hellenic Basketball Federation) Panathinaikos AKTOR	Fontvieille
19:00 (CET)	Scoring by quarter: 19–22, 28–17, 20–17, 23–35
	Pts: Diallo 17; Rebs: Brown 8 Asts: James 6 PIR: Walker, Diallo 21	Boxscore	Pts: Sloukas 17; Rebs: Mitoglou 7 Asts: Nunn, Grant 4 PIR: Lessort 24	Arena: Salle Gaston Médecin; Attendance: 4,584; Referees: Emilio Pérez, Jakub Zamojski, Miloš Koljenšić

20 December 2023	Bayern Munich (German Basketball Federation)	86–71	(Turkish Basketball Federation) Anadolu Efes	Munich
20:30 (CET)	Scoring by quarter: 20–17, 30–24, 21–18, 15–12
	Pts: Obst 17; Rebs: Ibaka 7 Asts: Francisco 6 PIR: Bonga 24	Boxscore	Pts: Oturu 19; Rebs: Oturu 8 Asts: Larkin 6 PIR: Oturu 30	Arena: BMW Park; Attendance: 5,597; Referees: Mehdi Difallah, Carlos Cortés, Michele Rossi

20 December 2023	EA7 Emporio Armani Milan (Italian Basketball Federation)	84–61	(French Federation of Basketball) LDLC ASVEL	Assago
20:30 (CET)	Scoring by quarter: 22–21, 24–15, 21–12, 17–13
	Pts: Melli 17; Rebs: Voigtmann, Shields 5 Asts: Flaccadori 7 PIR: Shields 25	Boxscore	Pts: Lauvergne 12; Rebs: Egbunu 7 Asts: Lighty 4 PIR: Lauvergne 15	Arena: Mediolanum Forum; Attendance: 8,025; Referees: Miguel Ángel Pérez, Uroš Nikolić, Eduard Udyanskyy

=== Round 16 ===
21 December 2023	Maccabi Playtika Tel Aviv (Israeli Basketball Association)	92–98	(Basketball Federation of Serbia) Crvena zvezda Meridianbet	Belgrade
20:05 (CET)	Scoring by quarter: 20–20, 22–31, 23–28, 27–19
	Pts: Baldwin 22; Rebs: Nebo 7 Asts: Brown 6 PIR: Baldwin 30	Boxscore	Pts: Teodosić 27; Rebs: Mitrović 7 Asts: Teodosić 14; PIR: Teodosić 40	Arena: Aleksandar Nikolić Hall; Attendance: 0 Referees: Sreten Radović, Jordi Aliaga, Alberto Baena

21 December 2023	Valencia Basket (Spanish Basketball Federation)	79–71	(Italian Basketball Federation) Virtus Segafredo Bologna	Valencia
20:30 (CET)	Scoring by quarter: 26–21, 11–26, 23–7, 19–17
	Pts: Jones 17; Rebs: four players 5 Asts: Jović 3 PIR: Jones 19	Boxscore	Pts: Shengelia 15; Rebs: Shengelia 8 Asts: Shengelia, Hackett 6 PIR: Shengelia 19	Arena: La Fonteta; Attendance: 6,087; Referees: Tomislav Hordov, Robert Vyklický, Vassilis Pitsilkas

21 December 2023	Real Madrid (Spanish Basketball Federation)	91–75	(Basketball Federation of Serbia) Partizan Mozzart Bet	Madrid
20:45 (CET)	Scoring by quarter: 26–19, 22–17, 28–15, 15–24
	Pts: Musa 23; Rebs: Tavares 8 Asts: Rodríguez 9 PIR: Musa 27	Boxscore	Pts: Caboclo 18; Rebs: Ponitka 7 Asts: Nunnally 4 PIR: Koprivica 15	Arena: WiZink Center; Attendance: 9,563; Referees: Robert Lottermoser, Joseph Bissang, Kristaps Konstantinovs

22 December 2023	Anadolu Efes (Turkish Basketball Federation)	80–87	(Spanish Basketball Federation) Baskonia	Istanbul
18:15 (CET)	Scoring by quarter: 17–17, 19–19, 24–21, 20–30
	Pts: Larkin 23; Rebs: Bryant, Oturu 7 Asts: Larkin 5 PIR: Larkin 25	Boxscore	Pts: Howard 28; Rebs: Miller-McIntyre, Moneke 9 Asts: Miller-McIntyre 10; PIR: Miller-McIntyre 26	Arena: Sinan Erdem Dome; Attendance: 11,406; Referees: Ilija Belošević, Rain Peerandi, Thomas Bissuel

22 December 2023	Žalgiris (Lithuanian Basketball Federation)	80–85	(Spanish Basketball Federation) Barcelona	Kaunas
19:00 (CET)	Scoring by quarter: 22–28, 29–28, 22–14, 7–15
	Pts: Birutis 18; Rebs: Šmits 7 Asts: Dimša 4 PIR: Ulanovas, Birutis 20	Boxscore	Pts: Laprovíttola 18; Rebs: Kalinić, Parker 8 Asts: Kalinić, Satoranský 6 PIR: Veselý 22	Arena: Žalgirio Arena; Attendance: 14,953; Referees: Carmelo Paternicò, Sašo Petek, Hugues Thépénier

22 December 2023	LDLC ASVEL (French Federation of Basketball)	73–85	(Hellenic Basketball Federation) Olympiacos	Décines-Charpieu
19:45 (CET)	Scoring by quarter: 18–25, 19–24, 20–22, 16–14
	Pts: Luwawu-Cabarrot, Lee 16; Rebs: Lauvergne 8 Asts: Lee 7 PIR: Lee 19	Boxscore	Pts: Canaan 19; Rebs: Fall 7 Asts: Fall, Williams-Goss 7 PIR: Fall 23	Arena: LDLC Arena; Attendance: 8,100; Referees: Oļegs Latiševs, Anne Panther, Seffi Shemmesh

22 December 2023	ALBA Berlin (German Basketball Federation)	82–91	(Turkish Basketball Federation) Fenerbahçe Beko	Berlin
20:15 (CET)	Scoring by quarter: 26–24, 21–27, 12–21, 23–19
	Pts: Brown 15; Rebs: Koumadje, Brown 5 Asts: Delow 4 PIR: Thiemann 14	Boxscore	Pts: Wilbekin 20; Rebs: Motley 6 Asts: Calathes 13; PIR: Wilbekin 22	Arena: Mercedes-Benz Arena; Attendance: 13,113; Referees: Mehdi Difallah, Ioannis Foufis, Amit Balak

22 December 2023	Bayern Munich (German Basketball Federation)	80–91	(French Federation of Basketball) AS Monaco	Munich
20:30 (CET)	Scoring by quarter: 14–17, 17–29, 29–21, 20–24
	Pts: Francisco 21; Rebs: Ibaka 7 Asts: Weiler-Babb, Francisco 4 PIR: Francisco 26	Boxscore	Pts: James 28; Rebs: Hall, Blossomgame 5 Asts: Okobo 5 PIR: James 29	Arena: BMW Park; Attendance: 6,254; Referees: Saša Pukl, Artūras Šukys, Aare Halliko

22 December 2023	EA7 Emporio Armani Milan (Italian Basketball Federation)	68–76	(Hellenic Basketball Federation) Panathinaikos AKTOR	Assago
20:45 (CET)	Scoring by quarter: 24–22, 17–19, 15–18, 12–17
	Pts: Shields 13; Rebs: Melli 8 Asts: three players 3 PIR: Shields 18	Boxscore	Pts: Nunn 17; Rebs: Hernangómez 7 Asts: Sloukas 6 PIR: Sloukas 19	Arena: Mediolanum Forum; Attendance: 11,548; Referees: Damir Javor, Milan Nedović, Maxime Boubert

=== Round 17 ===
28 December 2023	Anadolu Efes (Turkish Basketball Federation)	84–89	(Turkish Basketball Federation) Fenerbahçe Beko	Istanbul
18:30 (CET)	Scoring by quarter: 29–29, 23–18, 16–22, 16–20
	Pts: Larkin 28; Rebs: Oturu 7 Asts: Larkin 5 PIR: Larkin 37	Boxscore	Pts: Hayes-Davis 24; Rebs: Hayes 6 Asts: Calathes 8 PIR: Hayes 27	Arena: Sinan Erdem Dome; Attendance: 15,041; Referees: Sreten Radović, Uroš Nikolić, Sašo Petek

28 December 2023	Partizan Mozzart Bet (Basketball Federation of Serbia)	75–77	(Italian Basketball Federation) Virtus Segafredo Bologna	Belgrade
18:30 (CET)	Scoring by quarter: 18–23, 18–18, 19–19, 20–17
	Pts: Nunnally 19; Rebs: Jaramaz 6 Asts: Nunnally 6 PIR: Jaramaz 20	Boxscore	Pts: Lundberg 16; Rebs: Dunston 6 Asts: Shengelia, Hackett 4 PIR: Lundberg 20	Arena: Štark Arena; Attendance: 20,086; Referees: Emin Moğulkoç, Artūras Šukys, Eduard Udyanskyy

28 December 2023	Žalgiris (Lithuanian Basketball Federation)	70–78	(Israeli Basketball Association) Maccabi Playtika Tel Aviv	Kaunas
19:00 (CET)	Scoring by quarter: 18–16, 15–16, 16–29, 21–17
	Pts: Evans 18; Rebs: Birutis 9 Asts: Ulanovas 3 PIR: Birutis 17	Boxscore	Pts: Nebo 22; Rebs: Nebo, Sorkin 6 Asts: Blatt 8 PIR: Nebo 27	Arena: Žalgirio Arena; Attendance: 14,979; Referees: Damir Javor, Carlos Cortés, Sérgio Silva

28 December 2023	LDLC ASVEL (French Federation of Basketball)	76–77	(Spanish Basketball Federation) Real Madrid	Décines-Charpieu
20:00 (CET)	Scoring by quarter: 19–18, 20–15, 18–18, 19–26
	Pts: Luwawu-Cabarrot 20; Rebs: Fall, Kahudi 6 Asts: Lee 7 PIR: Lee 19	Boxscore	Pts: Poirier 17; Rebs: Tavares 12; Asts: Rodríguez 6 PIR: Tavares 26	Arena: LDLC Arena; Attendance: 11,313; Referees: Piotr Pastusiak, Jurgis Laurinavičius, Hüseyin Çelik

28 December 2023	Panathinaikos AKTOR (Hellenic Basketball Federation)	82–65	(Basketball Federation of Serbia) Crvena zvezda Meridianbet	Marousi
20:15 (CET)	Scoring by quarter: 20–17, 18–14, 23–19, 21–15
	Pts: Mitoglou 15; Rebs: Hernangómez 8 Asts: Sloukas 7 PIR: Mitoglou 20	Boxscore	Pts: Nedović, Bolomboy 15; Rebs: Davidovac 7 Asts: dos Santos 4 PIR: Mitrović 19	Arena: OAKA Altion; Attendance: 18,124; Referees: Robert Lottermoser, Joseph Bissang, Mario Majkić

28 December 2023	EA7 Emporio Armani Milan (Italian Basketball Federation)	76–67	(Spanish Basketball Federation) Baskonia	Assago
20:30 (CET)	Scoring by quarter: 20–12, 26–19, 14–17, 16–19
	Pts: Melli 21; Rebs: Voigtmann 12; Asts: Flaccadori 5 PIR: Voigtmann 29	Boxscore	Pts: Moneke 14; Rebs: Sedekerskis 9 Asts: Chiozza 7 PIR: Moneke 20	Arena: Mediolanum Forum; Attendance: 11,639; Referees: Mehdi Difallah, Gytis Vilius, Josip Radojković

28 December 2023	Bayern Munich (German Basketball Federation)	85–84	(Spanish Basketball Federation) Valencia Basket	Munich
20:30 (CET)	Scoring by quarter: 16–16, 22–23, 22–23, 25–22
	Pts: Booker, Bolmaro 13; Rebs: Branković 8 Asts: Bolmaro 5 PIR: Bolmaro 20	Boxscore	Pts: Davies 21; Rebs: Reuvers 5 Asts: Jones 7 PIR: Jones 20	Arena: BMW Park; Attendance: 6,325; Referees: Ilija Belošević, Saulius Račys, Denis Hadžić

29 December 2023	ALBA Berlin (German Basketball Federation)	67–94	(Hellenic Basketball Federation) Olympiacos	Berlin
20:00 (CET)	Scoring by quarter: 25–19, 18–21, 8–27, 16–27
	Pts: Thomas 15; Rebs: Koumadje, Thiemann 4 Asts: Spagnolo, Thiemann 5 PIR: Thiemann 12	Boxscore	Pts: Peters 23; Rebs: Peters 7 Asts: Walkup 9 PIR: Peters 27	Arena: Mercedes-Benz Arena; Attendance: 11,265; Referees: Tomislav Hordov, Miloš Koljenšić, Kristaps Konstantinovs

29 December 2023	AS Monaco (French Federation of Basketball)	91–71	(Spanish Basketball Federation) Barcelona	Fontvieille
21:00 (CET)	Scoring by quarter: 27–15, 20–21, 20–16, 24–19
	Pts: James 20; Rebs: Hall 6 Asts: James 5 PIR: Diallo, James 23	Boxscore	Pts: Parker 15; Rebs: Hernangómez 6 Asts: Satoranský 4 PIR: Parker 14	Arena: Salle Gaston Médecin; Attendance: 5,000; Referees: Fernando Rocha, Luka Kardum, Adar Peer

=== Round 18 ===
2 January 2024	Fenerbahçe Beko (Turkish Basketball Federation)	76–85	(Basketball Federation of Serbia) Crvena zvezda Meridianbet	Istanbul
18:45 (CET)	Scoring by quarter: 26–18, 9–16, 22–23, 19–28
	Pts: Hayes-Davis 21; Rebs: Hayes 9 Asts: Wilbekin 4 PIR: Hayes 28	Boxscore	Pts: Bolomboy 24; Rebs: Giedraitis 7 Asts: Teodosić 8 PIR: Bolomboy 31	Arena: Ülker Sports and Event Hall; Attendance: 8,153; Referees: Jakub Zamojski, Maxime Boubert, Igor Dragojević

2 January 2024	Žalgiris (Lithuanian Basketball Federation)	77–71	(German Basketball Federation) ALBA Berlin	Kaunas
19:00 (CET)	Scoring by quarter: 22–25, 26–16, 13–11, 16–19
	Pts: Evans 13; Rebs: Lekavičius 6 Asts: Evans, Lekavičius 5 PIR: Dimša 19	Boxscore	Pts: Thiemann 17; Rebs: Wetzell 8 Asts: Brown 5 PIR: Spagnolo 18	Arena: Žalgirio Arena; Attendance: 14,715; Referees: Carlos Peruga, Sašo Petek, Eduard Udyanskyy

2 January 2024	Maccabi Playtika Tel Aviv (Israeli Basketball Association)	93–83	(French Federation of Basketball) AS Monaco	Belgrade
20:05 (CET)	Scoring by quarter: 22–12, 27–23, 15–19, 29–29
	Pts: Colson 27; Rebs: Sorkin 9 Asts: Baldwin 6 PIR: Colson 34	Boxscore	Pts: James 27; Rebs: Walker 6 Asts: James 7 PIR: James 32	Arena: Aleksandar Nikolić Hall; Attendance: 0 Referees: Ilija Belošević, Milan Nedović, Saulius Račys

2 January 2024	Olympiacos (Hellenic Basketball Federation)	79–74	(Italian Basketball Federation) EA7 Emporio Armani Milan	Piraeus
20:15 (CET)	Scoring by quarter: 18–19, 22–16, 23–15, 16–24
	Pts: Peters 16; Rebs: Fall, Peters 6 Asts: Fall 6 PIR: Fall 28	Boxscore	Pts: Napier, Flaccadori 14; Rebs: Napier, Hall 3 Asts: Napier 5 PIR: Napier 19	Arena: Peace and Friendship Stadium; Attendance: 12,117; Referees: Robert Lottermoser, Saša Pukl, Luka Kardum

2 January 2024	Partizan Mozzart Bet (Basketball Federation of Serbia)	90–77	(French Federation of Basketball) LDLC ASVEL	Belgrade
20:45 (CET)	Scoring by quarter: 23–17, 27–14, 19–14, 21–32
	Pts: Punter 22; Rebs: Kaminsky 7 Asts: Nunnally 4 PIR: Punter 22	Boxscore	Pts: Scott 24; Rebs: Scott 10; Asts: Lee 10; PIR: Scott 28	Arena: Štark Arena; Attendance: 20,012; Referees: Miguel Ángel Pérez, Ioannis Foufis, Gytis Vilius

3 January 2024	Valencia Basket (Spanish Basketball Federation)	93–88	(Turkish Basketball Federation) Anadolu Efes	Valencia
19:30 (CET)	Scoring by quarter: 18–18, 25–27, 28–21, 22–22
	Pts: Davies, Jones 15; Rebs: Inglis 10; Asts: Jones 6 PIR: Inglis 28	Boxscore	Pts: Larkin 20; Rebs: Pleiß 10; Asts: Beaubois 7 PIR: Larkin 20	Arena: La Fonteta; Attendance: 6,901; Referees: Damir Javor, Joseph Bissang, Artūras Šukys

3 January 2024	Virtus Segafredo Bologna (Italian Basketball Federation)	85–83	(German Basketball Federation) Bayern Munich	Bologna
20:30 (CET)	Scoring by quarter: 22–24, 20–22, 23–23, 20–14
	Pts: Shengelia 18; Rebs: Cordinier 9 Asts: Hackett 5 PIR: Shengelia 23	Boxscore	Pts: Edwards 22; Rebs: Ibaka 13; Asts: Bolmaro 4 PIR: Ibaka 23	Arena: Segafredo Arena; Attendance: 9,630; Referees: Uroš Nikolić, Mario Majkić, Alberto Baena

3 January 2024	Baskonia (Spanish Basketball Federation)	75–73	(Hellenic Basketball Federation) Panathinaikos AKTOR	Vitoria-Gasteiz
20:30 (CET)	Scoring by quarter: 13–12, 13–25, 24–16, 25–20
	Pts: Moneke 20; Rebs: Moneke 13; Asts: Marinković, Chiozza 4 PIR: Moneke 34	Boxscore	Pts: Nunn 25; Rebs: three players 6 Asts: Grant 5 PIR: Nunn 21	Arena: Buesa Arena; Attendance: 12,724; Referees: Carmelo Paternicò, Anne Panther, Hugues Thépénier

3 January 2024	Barcelona (Spanish Basketball Federation)	83–78	(Spanish Basketball Federation) Real Madrid	Barcelona
21:00 (CET)	Scoring by quarter: 21–25, 24–22, 15–15, 23–16
	Pts: Veselý 27; Rebs: Satoranský, Hernangómez 6 Asts: Laprovíttola 8 PIR: Veselý 28	Boxscore	Pts: Musa 19; Rebs: Tavares 7 Asts: Campazzo 8 PIR: Musa 24	Arena: Palau Blaugrana; Attendance: 7,611; Referees: Emin Moğulkoç, Mehdi Difallah, Kristaps Konstantinovs

=== Round 19 ===
4 January 2024	Fenerbahçe Beko (Turkish Basketball Federation)	109–74	(Israeli Basketball Association) Maccabi Playtika Tel Aviv	Panevėžys (Note: The match, originally to be played at Ülker Sports and Event Hall in Istanbul, was relocated to Lithuania on recommendation of both Turkish and Israeli governments regarding the Gaza war.)
18:45 (CET)	Scoring by quarter: 22–22, 35–9, 23–17, 29–26
	Pts: Dorsey 21; Rebs: Papagiannis 6 Asts: Calathes 7 PIR: Dorsey 21	Boxscore	Pts: Colson, Baldwin 13; Rebs: Colson 6 Asts: Brown 6 PIR: Colson 16	Arena: Kalnapilio Arena; Attendance: 2,938; Referees: Robert Lottermoser, Gytis Vilius, Marcin Kowalski

4 January 2024	LDLC ASVEL (French Federation of Basketball)	93–79	(Lithuanian Basketball Federation) Žalgiris	Villeurbanne
20:00 (CET)	Scoring by quarter: 23–17, 28–26, 21–16, 21–20
	Pts: Luwawu-Cabarrot 27; Rebs: Fall 12; Asts: Lee 8 PIR: Fall 36	Boxscore	Pts: Evans 21; Rebs: Šmits 5 Asts: Evans 5 PIR: Evans 21	Arena: Astroballe; Attendance: 5,458; Referees: Juan Carlos García, Jakub Zamojski, Adar Peer

4 January 2024	Crvena zvezda Meridianbet (Basketball Federation of Serbia)	88–72	(Basketball Federation of Serbia) Partizan Mozzart Bet	Belgrade
20:00 (CET)	Scoring by quarter: 24–13, 26–16, 15–19, 23–24
	Pts: Nedović 16; Rebs: Giedraitis 7 Asts: Teodosić 7 PIR: Teodosić 23	Boxscore	Pts: Punter 17; Rebs: Caboclo 7 Asts: Dozier, Nunnally 3 PIR: Caboclo 18	Arena: Štark Arena; Attendance: 20,143; Referees: Fernando Rocha, Carlos Peruga, Piotr Pastusiak

4 January 2024	Olympiacos (Hellenic Basketball Federation)	75–73	(French Federation of Basketball) AS Monaco	Piraeus
20:15 (CET)	Scoring by quarter: 17–21, 17–15, 22–22, 19–15
	Pts: Canaan 16; Rebs: Walkup 7 Asts: Walkup 9 PIR: Walkup 22	Boxscore	Pts: Jaiteh 14; Rebs: Ouattara 6 Asts: James 7 PIR: Jaiteh 14	Arena: Peace and Friendship Stadium; Attendance: 12,237; Referees: Oļegs Latiševs, Rain Peerandi, Michele Rossi

5 January 2024	ALBA Berlin (German Basketball Federation)	68–83	(Italian Basketball Federation) Virtus Segafredo Bologna	Berlin
19:00 (CET)	Scoring by quarter: 9–26, 18–22, 24–15, 17–20
	Pts: Spagnolo, Thiemann 13; Rebs: Koumadje 8 Asts: Brown 3 PIR: Koumadje 16	Boxscore	Pts: Shengelia, Dunston 12; Rebs: three players 6 Asts: Shengelia 5 PIR: Dunston 18	Arena: Mercedes-Benz Arena; Attendance: 9,589; Referees: Jordi Aliaga, Tomasz Trawicki, Marko Juras

5 January 2024	Valencia Basket (Spanish Basketball Federation)	81–82	(Hellenic Basketball Federation) Panathinaikos AKTOR	Valencia
20:30 (CET)	Scoring by quarter: 23–22, 24–25, 22–19, 12–16
	Pts: Ojeleye 13; Rebs: Ojeleye 8 Asts: Jones, Inglis 4 PIR: Ojeleye 17	Boxscore	Pts: Vildoza 19; Rebs: Grant, Mitoglou 5 Asts: Grant 6 PIR: Vildoza 18	Arena: La Fonteta; Attendance: 6,056; Referees: Mehdi Difallah, Milivoje Jovčić, Seffi Shemmesh

5 January 2024	Barcelona (Spanish Basketball Federation)	89–85	(Spanish Basketball Federation) Baskonia	Barcelona
20:30 (CET)	Scoring by quarter: 24–23, 23–19, 15–26, 27–17
	Pts: Veselý 23; Rebs: Satoranský 9 Asts: Laprovíttola 8 PIR: Veselý 28	Boxscore	Pts: Howard 21; Rebs: Sedekerskis 6 Asts: Miller-McIntyre 7 PIR: Sedekerskis 20	Arena: Palau Blaugrana; Attendance: 4,971; Referees: Damir Javor, Miloš Koljenšić, Leandro Lezcano

5 January 2024	EA7 Emporio Armani Milan (Italian Basketball Federation)	76–62	(German Basketball Federation) Bayern Munich	Assago
20:30 (CET)	Scoring by quarter: 19–12, 15–15, 16–20, 26–15
	Pts: Hall 19; Rebs: three players 4 Asts: Napier 5 PIR: Hall 21	Boxscore	Pts: Ibaka 16; Rebs: Booker 8 Asts: Edwards, Bolmaro 3 PIR: Ibaka, Lučić 14	Arena: Mediolanum Forum; Attendance: 10,424; Referees: Emin Moğulkoç, Tomislav Hordov, Carlos Cortés

5 January 2024	Real Madrid (Spanish Basketball Federation)	130–126(OT)	(Turkish Basketball Federation) Anadolu Efes	Madrid
20:45 (CET)	Scoring by quarter: 25–18, 13–18, 26–25, 17–20, Overtime: 10–10, 11–11, 9–9, 19–15
	Pts: Musa 40; Rebs: Hezonja, Tavares 12; Asts: Campazzo 11; PIR: Musa 45	Boxscore	Pts: Larkin 32; Rebs: Pleiß 11; Asts: Larkin 9 PIR: Larkin 33	Arena: WiZink Center; Attendance: 8,221; Referees: Matej Boltauzer, Robert Vyklický, Sérgio Silva

=== Round 20 ===
9 January 2024	Fenerbahçe Beko (Turkish Basketball Federation)	91–76	(Basketball Federation of Serbia) Partizan Mozzart Bet	Istanbul
18:30 (CET)	Scoring by quarter: 19–31, 24–17, 25–16, 23–12
	Pts: Dorsey 24; Rebs: Hayes-Davis 7 Asts: Calathes 7 PIR: Dorsey 23	Boxscore	Pts: Punter 18; Rebs: LeDay 6 Asts: Dozier 6 PIR: Punter, Caboclo 14	Arena: Ülker Sports and Event Hall; Attendance: 9,375; Referees: Mehdi Difallah, Milan Nedović, Jordi Aliaga

9 January 2024	AS Monaco (French Federation of Basketball)	93–83	(Spanish Basketball Federation) Baskonia	Fontvieille
19:00 (CET)	Scoring by quarter: 21–22, 22–17, 28–20, 22–24
	Pts: James 26; Rebs: Brown 5 Asts: James 7 PIR: James 28	Boxscore	Pts: Howard 33; Rebs: Moneke 13; Asts: Miller-McIntyre 11; PIR: Howard 25	Arena: Salle Gaston Médecin; Attendance: 3,622; Referees: Robert Lottermoser, Uroš Nikolić, Artūras Šukys

9 January 2024	Bayern Munich (German Basketball Federation)	71–92	(Spanish Basketball Federation) Real Madrid	Munich
20:00 (CET)	Scoring by quarter: 18–24, 18–21, 17–19, 18–28
	Pts: Francisco 14; Rebs: Bolmaro, Ibaka 5 Asts: three players 3 PIR: Francisco 14	Boxscore	Pts: Poirier 18; Rebs: Campazzo 7 Asts: Llull 4 PIR: Poirier 23	Arena: BMW Park; Attendance: 6,377; Referees: Sreten Radović, Saša Pukl, Seffi Shemmesh

9 January 2024	Panathinaikos AKTOR (Hellenic Basketball Federation)	83–76	(Turkish Basketball Federation) Anadolu Efes	Marousi
20:15 (CET)	Scoring by quarter: 25–14, 26–21, 17–22, 15–19
	Pts: Grigonis 24; Rebs: Mitoglou 7 Asts: Sloukas 9 PIR: Grigonis 28	Boxscore	Pts: Beaubois 16; Rebs: Pleiß 11; Asts: Thompson 5 PIR: Bryant 23	Arena: OAKA Altion; Attendance: 17,850; Referees: Ilija Belošević, Carlos Peruga, Gytis Vilius

9 January 2024	EA7 Emporio Armani Milan (Italian Basketball Federation)	82–76	(German Basketball Federation) ALBA Berlin	Assago
20:30 (CET)	Scoring by quarter: 16–17, 21–18, 23–23, 22–18
	Pts: Melli 16; Rebs: Voigtmann 8 Asts: Napier 5 PIR: Hall 20	Boxscore	Pts: Thiemann 13; Rebs: Thiemann, Koumadje 6 Asts: Spagnolo 7 PIR: Thiemann 19	Arena: Mediolanum Forum; Attendance: 8,579; Referees: Juan Carlos García, Rain Peerandi, Mario Majkić

9 January 2024	Valencia Basket (Spanish Basketball Federation)	79–84	(Lithuanian Basketball Federation) Žalgiris	Valencia
20:30 (CET)	Scoring by quarter: 21–27, 21–21, 22–14, 15–22
	Pts: Davies 18; Rebs: Davies 5 Asts: Jones 4 PIR: Davies 24	Boxscore	Pts: Evans 24; Rebs: Ulanovas 8 Asts: Evans 5 PIR: Evans 23	Arena: La Fonteta; Attendance: 5,987; Referees: Emin Moğulkoç, Ioannis Foufis, Luka Kardum

9 January 2024	LDLC ASVEL (French Federation of Basketball)	100–91	(Basketball Federation of Serbia) Crvena zvezda Meridianbet	Villeurbanne
20:30 (CET)	Scoring by quarter: 25–25, 23–20, 22–22, 30–24
	Pts: Lee 23; Rebs: Fall 9 Asts: Lee 7 PIR: Lee 23	Boxscore	Pts: Nedović 26; Rebs: Davidovac 6 Asts: dos Santos 9 PIR: dos Santos 23	Arena: Astroballe; Attendance: 5,283; Referees: Damir Javor, Carmelo Paternicò, Saulius Račys

10 January 2024	Barcelona (Spanish Basketball Federation)	86–78	(Hellenic Basketball Federation) Olympiacos	Barcelona
20:30 (CET)	Scoring by quarter: 27–20, 17–21, 31–22, 11–15
	Pts: Parker 21; Rebs: Hernangómez 5 Asts: Satoranský 5 PIR: Hernangómez 23	Boxscore	Pts: Peters 22; Rebs: Milutinov 8 Asts: Williams-Goss 5 PIR: Peters 16	Arena: Palau Blaugrana; Attendance: 6,053; Referees: Matej Boltauzer, Milivoje Jovčić, Jakub Zamojski

10 January 2024	Maccabi Playtika Tel Aviv (Israeli Basketball Association)	95–78	(Italian Basketball Federation) Virtus Segafredo Bologna	Belgrade
21:00 (CET)	Scoring by quarter: 18–21, 28–24, 24–15, 25–18
	Pts: Baldwin 22; Rebs: Nebo 12; Asts: Baldwin 8 PIR: Baldwin 29	Boxscore	Pts: Belinelli 24; Rebs: Dunston 9 Asts: Pajola 6 PIR: Belinelli 18	Arena: Aleksandar Nikolić Hall; Attendance: 0 Referees: Fernando Rocha, Emilio Pérez, Joseph Bissang

=== Round 21 ===
11 January 2024	Fenerbahçe Beko (Turkish Basketball Federation)	98–91(OT)	(German Basketball Federation) Bayern Munich	Istanbul
18:45 (CET)	Scoring by quarter: 22–22, 16–17, 19–20, 24–22, Overtime: 17–10
	Pts: Wilbekin 30; Rebs: Pierre 10; Asts: Calathes 6 PIR: Pierre 29	Boxscore	Pts: Francisco 21; Rebs: Lučić, Weiler-Babb 6 Asts: Bolmaro 6 PIR: Francisco 27	Arena: Ülker Sports and Event Hall; Attendance: 9,622; Referees: Juan Carlos García, Carlos Peruga, Eduard Udyanskyy

11 January 2024	Panathinaikos AKTOR (Hellenic Basketball Federation)	88–63	(French Federation of Basketball) AS Monaco	Marousi
20:15 (CET)	Scoring by quarter: 27–12, 16–18, 21–14, 24–19
	Pts: Lessort 23; Rebs: Lessort 9 Asts: Lessort 5 PIR: Lessort 42	Boxscore	Pts: Motiejūnas 13; Rebs: James 6 Asts: James 5 PIR: Motiejūnas 13	Arena: OAKA Altion; Attendance: 17,946; Referees: Miguel Ángel Pérez, Tomislav Hordov, Sérgio Silva

11 January 2024	EA7 Emporio Armani Milan (Italian Basketball Federation)	62–76	(Basketball Federation of Serbia) Crvena zvezda Meridianbet	Assago
20:30 (CET)	Scoring by quarter: 15–23, 16–24, 16–10, 15–19
	Pts: Bortolani 14; Rebs: Melli, Napier 5 Asts: Hall, Napier 4 PIR: Voigtmann 14	Boxscore	Pts: Giedraitis 22; Rebs: three players 6 Asts: Teodosić 5 PIR: Giedraitis 27	Arena: Mediolanum Forum; Attendance: 9,180; Referees: Oļegs Latiševs, Jordi Aliaga, Marcin Kowalski

11 January 2024	Real Madrid (Spanish Basketball Federation)	96–86(OT)	(Spanish Basketball Federation) Valencia Basket	Madrid
20:45 (CET)	Scoring by quarter: 16–24, 19–16, 23–15, 24–27, Overtime: 14–4
	Pts: Campazzo 19; Rebs: Tavares 19; Asts: Campazzo 7 PIR: Tavares 32	Boxscore	Pts: Davies 19; Rebs: Toure 7 Asts: Jones 6 PIR: Jović 21	Arena: WiZink Center; Attendance: 8,264; Referees: Robert Lottermoser, Miloš Koljenšić, Uroš Nikolić

12 January 2024	Anadolu Efes (Turkish Basketball Federation)	99–75	(Italian Basketball Federation) Virtus Segafredo Bologna	Istanbul
18:30 (CET)	Scoring by quarter: 26–15, 24–14, 23–25, 26–21
	Pts: Thompson 26; Rebs: Jones 10; Asts: Bryant 3 PIR: Thompson 31	Boxscore	Pts: Lundberg 14; Rebs: Cordinier 6 Asts: three players 3 PIR: Mickey 19	Arena: Sinan Erdem Dome; Attendance: 8,904; Referees: Mehdi Difallah, Milan Nedović, Carlos Cortés

12 January 2024	Partizan Mozzart Bet (Basketball Federation of Serbia)	88–79	(Israeli Basketball Association) Maccabi Playtika Tel Aviv	Belgrade
20:30 (CET)	Scoring by quarter: 11–29, 25–23, 31–15, 21–12
	Pts: Dozier 23; Rebs: Nunnally 9 Asts: Nunnally 5 PIR: Dozier 26	Boxscore	Pts: Baldwin 19; Rebs: Colson 8 Asts: Baldwin, Blatt 5 PIR: Baldwin 20	Arena: Štark Arena; Attendance: 20,066; Referees: Matej Boltauzer, Jakub Zamojski, Rain Peerandi

12 January 2024	Baskonia (Spanish Basketball Federation)	80–69	(Hellenic Basketball Federation) Olympiacos	Vitoria-Gasteiz
20:30 (CET)	Scoring by quarter: 14–17, 19–15, 26–17, 21–20
	Pts: Howard 21; Rebs: Kotsar 9 Asts: Miller-McIntyre 8 PIR: Moneke 26	Boxscore	Pts: Canaan 19; Rebs: Milutinov 14; Asts: Williams-Goss 8 PIR: Milutinov 31	Arena: Buesa Arena; Attendance: 10,164; Referees: Fernando Rocha, Piotr Pastusiak, Kristaps Konstantinovs

12 January 2024	Barcelona (Spanish Basketball Federation)	91–73	(Lithuanian Basketball Federation) Žalgiris	Barcelona
20:30 (CET)	Scoring by quarter: 26–12, 18–25, 24–20, 23–16
	Pts: Brizuela 24; Rebs: Hernangómez 8 Asts: Kalinić 5 PIR: Brizuela 23	Boxscore	Pts: Sumner 15; Rebs: Manek 6 Asts: Evans 5 PIR: Evans 15	Arena: Palau Blaugrana; Attendance: 6,655; Referees: Carmelo Paternicò, Igor Dragojević, Hugues Thépénier

12 January 2024	LDLC ASVEL (French Federation of Basketball)	63–88	(German Basketball Federation) ALBA Berlin	Villeurbanne
21:00 (CET)	Scoring by quarter: 20–19, 17–22, 13–21, 13–26
	Pts: Kahudi, Lee 12; Rebs: Lauvergne 6 Asts: Luwawu-Cabarrot 5 PIR: Lee 11	Boxscore	Pts: Wetzell, Brown 13; Rebs: Koumadje 10; Asts: Spagnolo 6 PIR: Wetzell 18	Arena: Astroballe; Attendance: 5,334; Referees: Emin Moğulkoç, Robert Vyklický, Alberto Baena

=== Round 22 ===
18 January 2024	Anadolu Efes (Turkish Basketball Federation)	98–74	(Spanish Basketball Federation) Barcelona	Istanbul
18:30 (CET)	Scoring by quarter: 18–13, 24–26, 30–21, 26–14
	Pts: Beaubois 21; Rebs: Pleiß, Willis 7 Asts: Larkin 8 PIR: Larkin 23	Boxscore	Pts: Hernangómez 18; Rebs: Parker 6 Asts: Satoranský, Jokubaitis 5 PIR: Hernangómez 15	Arena: Sinan Erdem Dome; Attendance: 15,124; Referees: Tomislav Hordov, Ioannis Foufis, Vasiliki Tsaroucha

18 January 2024	Crvena zvezda Meridianbet (Basketball Federation of Serbia)	90–91	(Spanish Basketball Federation) Baskonia	Belgrade
19:00 (CET)	Scoring by quarter: 30–20, 22–23, 10–26, 28–22
	Pts: dos Santos 26; Rebs: Bolomboy, Giedraitis 5 Asts: dos Santos 5 PIR: dos Santos 26	Boxscore	Pts: Howard 32; Rebs: Moneke 12; Asts: Miller-McIntyre 9 PIR: Moneke 27	Arena: Štark Arena; Attendance: 20,270; Referees: Matej Boltauzer, Milan Nedović, Hüseyin Çelik

18 January 2024	ALBA Berlin (German Basketball Federation)	65–82	(German Basketball Federation) Bayern Munich	Berlin
20:00 (CET)	Scoring by quarter: 19–19, 11–24, 21–23, 14–16
	Pts: Spagnolo 15; Rebs: Brown 8 Asts: Spagnolo 4 PIR: Spagnolo 17	Boxscore	Pts: Branković, Francisco 14; Rebs: Branković 9 Asts: Francisco 5 PIR: Branković 20	Arena: Mercedes-Benz Arena; Attendance: 10,229; Referees: Miguel Ángel Pérez, Uroš Nikolić, Josip Radojković

18 January 2024	Olympiacos (Hellenic Basketball Federation)	89–72	(Israeli Basketball Association) Maccabi Playtika Tel Aviv	Piraeus
20:15 (CET)	Scoring by quarter: 26–18, 16–18, 27–21, 20–15
	Pts: Canaan, Milutinov 20; Rebs: Milutinov 20; Asts: Walkup 7 PIR: Milutinov 40	Boxscore	Pts: Baldwin 18; Rebs: Nebo 9 Asts: Blatt 7 PIR: Baldwin 16	Arena: Peace and Friendship Stadium; Attendance: 12,175; Referees: Damir Javor, Carlos Cortés, Eduard Udyanskyy

18 January 2024	Virtus Segafredo Bologna (Italian Basketball Federation)	73–63	(French Federation of Basketball) LDLC ASVEL	Bologna
20:30 (CET)	Scoring by quarter: 19–10, 8–22, 18–22, 28–9
	Pts: Hackett 19; Rebs: Polonara 9 Asts: Pajola 7 PIR: Hackett 29	Boxscore	Pts: Fall 17; Rebs: Fall 12; Asts: Lee 12; PIR: Fall 25	Arena: Segafredo Arena; Attendance: 7,573; Referees: Carlos Peruga, Rain Peerandi, Sérgio Silva

19 January 2024	Žalgiris (Lithuanian Basketball Federation)	98–75	(Turkish Basketball Federation) Fenerbahçe Beko	Kaunas
19:00 (CET)	Scoring by quarter: 20–14, 23–21, 23–20, 32–20
	Pts: Evans 21; Rebs: Birutis 10; Asts: Evans 7 PIR: Birutis 28	Boxscore	Pts: Wilbekin 22; Rebs: Şanlı, Pierre 6 Asts: Wilbekin 6 PIR: Wilbekin 23	Arena: Žalgirio Arena; Attendance: 14,105; Referees: Ilija Belošević, Joseph Bissang, Thomas Bissuel

19 January 2024	AS Monaco (French Federation of Basketball)	98–74	(Spanish Basketball Federation) Real Madrid	Fontvieille
20:00 (CET)	Scoring by quarter: 33–20, 23–20, 24–14, 18–20
	Pts: Loyd 19; Rebs: Hall 7 Asts: James 12; PIR: James 32	Boxscore	Pts: Musa 12; Rebs: Poirier, Yabusele 9 Asts: Causeur, Alocén 2 PIR: Musa 15	Arena: Salle Gaston Médecin; Attendance: 4,698; Referees: Oļegs Latiševs, Gytis Vilius, Sašo Petek

19 January 2024	Panathinaikos AKTOR (Hellenic Basketball Federation)	84–71	(Basketball Federation of Serbia) Partizan Mozzart Bet	Marousi
20:15 (CET)	Scoring by quarter: 18–16, 24–24, 16–18, 26–13
	Pts: Nunn 21; Rebs: Lessort 9 Asts: Grant 5 PIR: Mitoglou 21	Boxscore	Pts: Dozier 16; Rebs: Dozier 7 Asts: Dozier 8 PIR: Dozier 28	Arena: OAKA Altion; Attendance: 18,421; Referees: Juan Carlos García, Emin Moğulkoç, Maxime Boubert

19 January 2024	Valencia Basket (Spanish Basketball Federation)	84–72	(Italian Basketball Federation) EA7 Emporio Armani Milan	Valencia
20:30 (CET)	Scoring by quarter: 21–19, 11–21, 29–19, 23–13
	Pts: Jones, Davies 15; Rebs: Ojeleye 7 Asts: Jones 6 PIR: Jones 29	Boxscore	Pts: Napier 20; Rebs: Hall 7 Asts: Hall 5 PIR: Hall 30	Arena: La Fonteta; Attendance: 6,107; Referees: Fernando Rocha, Jakub Zamojski, Robert Vyklický

=== Round 23 ===
25 January 2024	Fenerbahçe Beko (Turkish Basketball Federation)	88–75	(Italian Basketball Federation) Virtus Segafredo Bologna	Istanbul
18:45 (CET)	Scoring by quarter: 21–25, 31–22, 19–9, 17–19
	Pts: Motley 23; Rebs: Motley 11; Asts: Wilbekin 6 PIR: Motley 29	Boxscore	Pts: Lundberg 17; Rebs: Žižić 6 Asts: Cordinier 4 PIR: Cordinier 21	Arena: Ülker Sports and Event Hall; Attendance: 11,814; Referees: Matej Boltauzer, Oļegs Latiševs, Steve Bittner

25 January 2024	ALBA Berlin (German Basketball Federation)	89–80	(Basketball Federation of Serbia) Crvena zvezda Meridianbet	Berlin
20:00 (CET)	Scoring by quarter: 18–16, 33–20, 21–18, 17–26
	Pts: Thomas 19; Rebs: Wetzell 9 Asts: Hermannsson 5 PIR: Wetzell 21	Boxscore	Pts: dos Santos 20; Rebs: Bolomboy 11; Asts: four players 2 PIR: dos Santos 19	Arena: Mercedes-Benz Arena; Attendance: 8,579; Referees: Carlos Peruga, Michele Rossi, Dragan Porobić

25 January 2024	Maccabi Playtika Tel Aviv (Israeli Basketball Association)	90–75	(Hellenic Basketball Federation) Panathinaikos AKTOR	Belgrade
20:05 (CET)	Scoring by quarter: 18–21, 25–15, 19–23, 28–16
	Pts: Baldwin 22; Rebs: Nebo 12; Asts: Baldwin 8 PIR: Baldwin 33	Boxscore	Pts: Kalaitzakis 17; Rebs: Mitoglou 8 Asts: Grant 5 PIR: Grant, Mitoglou 15	Arena: Aleksandar Nikolić Hall; Attendance: 0 Referees: Robert Lottermoser, Uroš Nikolić, Sašo Petek

25 January 2024	Bayern Munich (German Basketball Federation)	64–76	(French Federation of Basketball) LDLC ASVEL	Munich
20:30 (CET)	Scoring by quarter: 19–20, 10–20, 21–19, 14–17
	Pts: Edwards 21; Rebs: Harris 6 Asts: three players 2 PIR: Edwards 21	Boxscore	Pts: Lee 21; Rebs: Fall 13; Asts: Lee 4 PIR: Fall 28	Arena: BMW Park; Attendance: 5,779; Referees: Milivoje Jovčić, Gytis Vilius, Carlos Cortés

25 January 2024	Real Madrid (Spanish Basketball Federation)	90–85	(Hellenic Basketball Federation) Olympiacos	Madrid
20:45 (CET)	Scoring by quarter: 30–13, 22–17, 16–25, 22–30
	Pts: Musa 20; Rebs: Poirier 9 Asts: Campazzo 9 PIR: Campazzo 21	Boxscore	Pts: Papanikolaou 25; Rebs: Sikma 10; Asts: Mitrou-Long 7 PIR: Papanikolaou 26	Arena: WiZink Center; Attendance: 10,432; Referees: Ilija Belošević, Carmelo Paternicò, Saulius Račys

26 January 2024	Anadolu Efes (Turkish Basketball Federation)	78–80	(French Federation of Basketball) AS Monaco	Istanbul
18:30 (CET)	Scoring by quarter: 23–22, 20–17, 17–26, 18–15
	Pts: Beaubois 15; Rebs: Oturu, Pleiß 6 Asts: Larkin 5 PIR: Larkin 19	Boxscore	Pts: Okobo, James 16; Rebs: Diallo 9 Asts: Okobo, Diallo 3 PIR: Okobo 17	Arena: Sinan Erdem Dome; Attendance: 14,912; Referees: Juan Carlos García, Fernando Rocha, Nick van den Broeck

26 January 2024	Baskonia (Spanish Basketball Federation)	62–77	(Spanish Basketball Federation) Valencia Basket	Vitoria-Gasteiz
20:30 (CET)	Scoring by quarter: 13–16, 16–29, 19–13, 14–19
	Pts: Moneke 16; Rebs: Sedekerskis 6 Asts: Miller-McIntyre 4 PIR: Moneke 18	Boxscore	Pts: Davies 19; Rebs: Inglis 7 Asts: Davies 4 PIR: Davies 24	Arena: Buesa Arena; Attendance: 10,391; Referees: Sreten Radović, Saša Pukl, Marko Juras

26 January 2024	Partizan Mozzart Bet (Basketball Federation of Serbia)	81–72	(Lithuanian Basketball Federation) Žalgiris	Belgrade
20:30 (CET)	Scoring by quarter: 22–26, 23–17, 16–16, 20–13
	Pts: Dozier 23; Rebs: Punter, LeDay 5 Asts: Dozier 4 PIR: LeDay 32	Boxscore	Pts: Evans 25; Rebs: Šmits 6 Asts: Evans, Ulanovas 3 PIR: Evans 23	Arena: Štark Arena; Attendance: 20,017; Referees: Emilio Pérez, Tomislav Hordov, Vassilis Pitsilkas

26 January 2024	EA7 Emporio Armani Milan (Italian Basketball Federation)	74–70	(Spanish Basketball Federation) Barcelona	Assago
20:30 (CET)	Scoring by quarter: 23–12, 24–16, 10–21, 17–21
	Pts: Shields 23; Rebs: Melli 7 Asts: Napier, Shields 5 PIR: Shields 26	Boxscore	Pts: Veselý 28; Rebs: Kalinić 10; Asts: Jokubaitis 6 PIR: Veselý 29	Arena: Forum; Attendance: 11,516; Referees: Mehdi Difallah, Milan Nedović, Josip Radojković

=== Round 24 ===
30 January 2024	Bayern Munich (German Basketball Federation)	112–109(OT)	(Spanish Basketball Federation) Baskonia	Munich
20:00 (CET)	Scoring by quarter: 25–19, 31–33, 26–24, 12–18, Overtime: 18–15
	Pts: Ibaka 21; Rebs: Ibaka 7 Asts: Francisco, Edwards 6 PIR: Ibaka 25	Boxscore	Pts: Howard 27; Rebs: Díez 6 Asts: Miller-McIntyre 15; PIR: Miller-McIntyre 39	Arena: BMW Park; Attendance: 6,095; Referees: Mehdi Difallah, Carmelo Paternicò, Maxime Boubert

30 January 2024	LDLC ASVEL (French Federation of Basketball)	73–83	(Turkish Basketball Federation) Fenerbahçe Beko	Décines-Charpieu
20:00 (CET)	Scoring by quarter: 18–16, 24–23, 14–28, 17–16
	Pts: Scott 26; Rebs: Fall 11; Asts: Lee, Jackson 4 PIR: Scott 23	Boxscore	Pts: Motley 24; Rebs: Noua 7 Asts: Calathes 8 PIR: Motley 24	Arena: LDLC Arena; Attendance: 8,568; Referees: Juan Carlos García, Milan Nedović, Marcin Kowalski

30 January 2024	Crvena zvezda Meridianbet (Basketball Federation of Serbia)	82–64	(Spanish Basketball Federation) Valencia Basket	Belgrade
20:00 (CET)	Scoring by quarter: 11–12, 28–18, 22–19, 21–15
	Pts: Nedović 27; Rebs: Bolomboy 7 Asts: Teodosić 7 PIR: Nedović 27	Boxscore	Pts: Jones 11; Rebs: Inglis, Ojeleye 5 Asts: four players 2 PIR: Jones 12	Arena: Štark Arena; Attendance: 18,346; Referees: Robert Lottermoser, Emin Moğulkoç, Sašo Petek

30 January 2024	Olympiacos (Hellenic Basketball Federation)	101–87	(German Basketball Federation) ALBA Berlin	Piraeus
20:15 (CET)	Scoring by quarter: 20–17, 25–31, 33–13, 23–26
	Pts: Canaan 31; Rebs: Sikma 6 Asts: Papanikolaou 7 PIR: Canaan 30	Boxscore	Pts: Mattisseck, Schneider 12; Rebs: Wetzell, Schneider 5 Asts: Spagnolo 6 PIR: Wetzell 14	Arena: Peace and Friendship Stadium; Attendance: 9,887; Referees: Emilio Pérez, Jakub Zamojski, Uroš Obrknežević

30 January 2024	Real Madrid (Spanish Basketball Federation)	106–101	(Israeli Basketball Association) Maccabi Playtika Tel Aviv	Madrid
20:30 (CET)	Scoring by quarter: 29–18, 23–27, 28–28, 26–28
	Pts: Musa 19; Rebs: Poirier 10; Asts: Campazzo, Hezonja 5 PIR: Poirier 29	Boxscore	Pts: Baldwin 28; Rebs: three players 6 Asts: Brown 9 PIR: Colson 28	Arena: WiZink Center; Attendance: 8,326; Referees: Sreten Radović, Fernando Rocha, Artūras Šukys

31 January 2024	Žalgiris (Lithuanian Basketball Federation)	96–70	(Turkish Basketball Federation) Anadolu Efes	Kaunas
19:00 (CET)	Scoring by quarter: 34–14, 24–23, 18–22, 20–11
	Pts: Birutis 18; Rebs: Hayes 9 Asts: Dimša 7 PIR: Birutis 27	Boxscore	Pts: Clyburn 19; Rebs: Pleiß 6 Asts: Clyburn 4 PIR: Clyburn 23	Arena: Žalgirio Arena; Attendance: 14,653; Referees: Carlos Peruga, Miloš Koljenšić, Eduard Udyanskyy

31 January 2024	AS Monaco (French Federation of Basketball)	85–70	(Basketball Federation of Serbia) Partizan Mozzart Bet	Fontvieille
19:00 (CET)	Scoring by quarter: 14–16, 30–22, 21–23, 20–9
	Pts: James 19; Rebs: Jaiteh, Motiejūnas 6 Asts: James 7 PIR: James 31	Boxscore	Pts: Punter 28; Rebs: Dozier 5 Asts: Avramović 5 PIR: Punter 31	Arena: Salle Gaston Médecin; Attendance: 3,673; Referees: Miguel Ángel Pérez, Jordi Aliaga, Josip Radojković

31 January 2024	Panathinaikos AKTOR (Hellenic Basketball Federation)	79–62	(Italian Basketball Federation) EA7 Emporio Armani Milan	Marousi
20:15 (CET)	Scoring by quarter: 21–16, 23–12, 13–13, 22–21
	Pts: Grigonis 15; Rebs: Lessort 7 Asts: Grant 8 PIR: Lessort 20	Boxscore	Pts: Napier 16; Rebs: Voigtmann 7 Asts: Napier, Lô 3 PIR: Napier 19	Arena: OAKA Altion; Attendance: 11,597; Referees: Damir Javor, Gytis Vilius, Kristaps Konstantinovs

31 January 2024	Barcelona (Spanish Basketball Federation)	84–57	(Italian Basketball Federation) Virtus Segafredo Bologna	Barcelona
20:30 (CET)	Scoring by quarter: 20–17, 21–10, 20–17, 23–13
	Pts: Hernangómez 17; Rebs: Veselý 13; Asts: Satoranský 7 PIR: Hernangómez 20	Boxscore	Pts: Cordinier 12; Rebs: Cordinier 5 Asts: three players 2 PIR: Cordinier 14	Arena: Palau Blaugrana; Attendance: 6,588; Referees: Ilija Belošević, Uroš Nikolić, Gentian Cici

=== Round 25 ===
1 February 2024	ALBA Berlin (German Basketball Federation)	66–81	(Spanish Basketball Federation) Valencia Basket	Berlin
20:00 (CET)	Scoring by quarter: 15–20, 15–22, 15–23, 21–16
	Pts: Thomas 15; Rebs: Schneider, Koumadje 5 Asts: Spagnolo 5 PIR: Spagnolo 16	Boxscore	Pts: Ojeleye 18; Rebs: Pradilla 9 Asts: Jones 8 PIR: Ojeleye 22	Arena: Mercedes-Benz Arena; Attendance: 9,236; Referees: Carmelo Paternicò, Mehdi Difallah, Thomas Bissuel

1 February 2024	Baskonia (Spanish Basketball Federation)	92–82	(Israeli Basketball Association) Maccabi Playtika Tel Aviv	Vitoria-Gasteiz
20:30 (CET)	Scoring by quarter: 20–26, 34–21, 19–16, 19–19
	Pts: Howard 26; Rebs: Moneke 15; Asts: Miller-McIntyre 8 PIR: Kotsar 26	Boxscore	Pts: Baldwin 25; Rebs: Colson 9 Asts: Baldwin 6 PIR: Baldwin 30	Arena: Buesa Arena; Attendance: 8,060; Referees: Emin Moğulkoç, Milivoje Jovčić, Marcin Kowalski

1 February 2024	Bayern Munich (German Basketball Federation)	72–76	(Hellenic Basketball Federation) Olympiacos	Munich
20:30 (CET)	Scoring by quarter: 14–18, 24–17, 13–19, 21–22
	Pts: Francisco, Ibaka 18; Rebs: Ibaka 8 Asts: Bolmaro 4 PIR: Ibaka 23	Boxscore	Pts: Walkup 16; Rebs: Brazdeikis 5 Asts: Walkup 8 PIR: Walkup 19	Arena: BMW Park; Attendance: 6,311; Referees: Juan Carlos García, Joseph Bissang, Igor Dragojević

1 February 2024	Real Madrid (Spanish Basketball Federation)	86–79	(French Federation of Basketball) LDLC ASVEL	Madrid
20:45 (CET)	Scoring by quarter: 24–18, 21–17, 17–15, 24–29
	Pts: Yabusele 26; Rebs: Abalde, Poirier 5 Asts: Rodríguez 9 PIR: Yabusele 33	Boxscore	Pts: Lee 23; Rebs: Scott, Fall 6 Asts: Lee 7 PIR: Lee 28	Arena: WiZink Center; Attendance: 5,984; Referees: Tomislav Hordov, Seffi Shemmesh, Leandro Lezcano

2 February 2024	Anadolu Efes (Turkish Basketball Federation)	79–73	(Italian Basketball Federation) EA7 Emporio Armani Milan	Istanbul
18:30 (CET)	Scoring by quarter: 15–15, 19–28, 30–7, 15–23
	Pts: Larkin 19; Rebs: Willis 8 Asts: Larkin 6 PIR: Larkin 24	Boxscore	Pts: Shields 17; Rebs: Shields, Melli 7 Asts: Napier 7 PIR: Shields 20	Arena: Sinan Erdem Dome; Attendance: 12,074; Referees: Miguel Ángel Pérez, Luka Kardum, Alberto Baena

2 February 2024	Žalgiris (Lithuanian Basketball Federation)	80–68	(Hellenic Basketball Federation) Panathinaikos AKTOR	Kaunas
19:00 (CET)	Scoring by quarter: 25–25, 19–13, 20–18, 16–12
	Pts: Evans 24; Rebs: Butkevičius 9 Asts: Evans 5 PIR: Evans 35	Boxscore	Pts: Nunn 26; Rebs: Lessort 7 Asts: Nunn 4 PIR: Nunn 21	Arena: Žalgirio Arena; Attendance: 15,074; Referees: Sreten Radović, Piotr Pastusiak, Carlos Cortés

2 February 2024	Crvena zvezda Meridianbet (Basketball Federation of Serbia)	76–85	(Spanish Basketball Federation) Barcelona	Belgrade
20:00 (CET)	Scoring by quarter: 17–18, 15–27, 19–19, 25–21
	Pts: Nedović 21; Rebs: Bolomboy 10; Asts: dos Santos 7 PIR: Bolomboy 21	Boxscore	Pts: Brizuela 20; Rebs: Veselý 8 Asts: Satoranský 6 PIR: Brizuela 22	Arena: Štark Arena; Attendance: 20,875; Referees: Fernando Rocha, Saulius Račys, Kristaps Konstantinovs

2 February 2024	Virtus Segafredo Bologna (Italian Basketball Federation)	88–84	(Basketball Federation of Serbia) Partizan Mozzart Bet	Bologna
20:30 (CET)	Scoring by quarter: 19–19, 16–12, 27–27, 26–26
	Pts: Belinelli, Lundberg 20; Rebs: Dunston 6 Asts: three players 4 PIR: Lundberg 26	Boxscore	Pts: Punter 22; Rebs: Dozier 4 Asts: Dozier 3 PIR: Punter 18	Arena: Segafredo Arena; Attendance: 9,544; Referees: Robert Lottermoser, Saša Pukl, Tomasz Trawicki

2 February 2024	AS Monaco (French Federation of Basketball)	76–69	(Turkish Basketball Federation) Fenerbahçe Beko	Fontvieille
20:30 (CET)	Scoring by quarter: 21–15, 15–19, 19–17, 21–8
	Pts: James 23; Rebs: Hall 5 Asts: James 6 PIR: James 29	Boxscore	Pts: Şanlı 12; Rebs: Motley 7 Asts: Wilbekin 5 PIR: Motley 14	Arena: Salle Gaston Médecin; Attendance: 2,164; Referees: Damir Javor, Ioannis Foufis, Amit Balak

=== Round 26 ===
8 February 2024	Anadolu Efes (Turkish Basketball Federation)	105–91	(Israeli Basketball Association) Maccabi Playtika Tel Aviv	Riga (Note: The match, originally to be played at Sinan Erdem Dome in Istanbul, was relocated to Latvia on recommendation of both Turkish and Israeli governments regarding the Gaza war.)
18:30 (CET)	Scoring by quarter: 29–27, 21–24, 27–24, 28–16
	Pts: Larkin 22; Rebs: three players 7 Asts: Larkin 6 PIR: Larkin 32	Boxscore	Pts: Baldwin 26; Rebs: Nebo 7 Asts: Blatt 9 PIR: Baldwin 32	Arena: Arena Riga; Attendance: 7,813; Referees: Emilio Pérez, Oļegs Latiševs, Hugues Thépénier

8 February 2024	Baskonia (Spanish Basketball Federation)	94–80	(French Federation of Basketball) LDLC ASVEL	Vitoria-Gasteiz
20:30 (CET)	Scoring by quarter: 23–20, 29–19, 19–22, 23–19
	Pts: Howard 18; Rebs: Miller-McIntyre 11; Asts: Miller-McIntyre 20; PIR: Miller-McIntyre 42	Boxscore	Pts: Lauvergne 16; Rebs: Lauvergne 10; Asts: Jackson 4 PIR: Lauvergne 25	Arena: Buesa Arena; Attendance: 8,054; Referees: Ilija Belošević, Uroš Nikolić, Piotr Pastusiak

8 February 2024	Partizan Mozzart Bet (Basketball Federation of Serbia)	78–79	(German Basketball Federation) Bayern Munich	Belgrade
20:30 (CET)	Scoring by quarter: 23–26, 22–15, 18–18, 15–20
	Pts: Punter 22; Rebs: Kaminsky 7 Asts: Kaminsky 3 PIR: Punter, Kaminsky 21	Boxscore	Pts: Francisco 20; Rebs: Bonga 7 Asts: Weiler-Babb 6 PIR: Francisco 25	Arena: Štark Arena; Attendance: 20,174; Referees: Fernando Rocha, Carlos Peruga, Saulius Račys

8 February 2024	Valencia Basket (Spanish Basketball Federation)	65–78	(Hellenic Basketball Federation) Olympiacos	Valencia
20:30 (CET)	Scoring by quarter: 19–21, 20–19, 9–20, 17–18
	Pts: Ojeleye 19; Rebs: Inglis, López-Arostegui 5 Asts: Jones 6 PIR: Ojeleye 25	Boxscore	Pts: Canaan 16; Rebs: Peters 11; Asts: Walkup 5 PIR: Wright 17	Arena: La Fonteta; Attendance: 7,017; Referees: Sreten Radović, Saša Pukl, Gytis Vilius

8 February 2024	EA7 Emporio Armani Milan (Italian Basketball Federation)	81–76	(Spanish Basketball Federation) Real Madrid	Assago
20:30 (CET)	Scoring by quarter: 23–19, 25–10, 18–25, 15–22
	Pts: Shields 27; Rebs: Mirotić, Voigtmann 5 Asts: Hall, Melli 3 PIR: Mirotić, Shields 29	Boxscore	Pts: Musa 12; Rebs: Poirier, Yabusele 7 Asts: Campazzo 7 PIR: Campazzo 13	Arena: Forum; Attendance: 11,457; Referees: Matej Boltauzer, Tomasz Trawicki, Mehdi Difallah

9 February 2024	Crvena zvezda Meridianbet (Basketball Federation of Serbia)	91–93	(Lithuanian Basketball Federation) Žalgiris	Belgrade
20:00 (CET)	Scoring by quarter: 22–23, 23–22, 20–23, 26–25
	Pts: dos Santos 21; Rebs: Giedraitis 8 Asts: dos Santos 14; PIR: dos Santos 32	Boxscore	Pts: Evans 25; Rebs: Hayes, Birutis 4 Asts: Evans 6 PIR: Evans 28	Arena: Štark Arena; Attendance: 18,754; Referees: Juan Carlos García, Carmelo Paternicò, Jordi Aliaga

9 February 2024	Panathinaikos AKTOR (Hellenic Basketball Federation)	74–63	(Turkish Basketball Federation) Fenerbahçe Beko	Marousi
20:15 (CET)	Scoring by quarter: 13–21, 25–9, 19–17, 17–16
	Pts: Nunn 23; Rebs: Lessort, Hernangómez 8 Asts: Kalaitzakis, Grant 2 PIR: Lessort 23	Boxscore	Pts: Motley 16; Rebs: Motley, Wilbekin 5 Asts: Calathes 5 PIR: Motley 20	Arena: OAKA Altion; Attendance: 17,732; Referees: Miguel Ángel Pérez, Miloš Koljenšić, Luka Kardum

9 February 2024	Virtus Segafredo Bologna (Italian Basketball Federation)	78–81	(French Federation of Basketball) AS Monaco	Bologna
20:30 (CET)	Scoring by quarter: 16–21, 19–24, 19–15, 24–21
	Pts: Belinelli 21; Rebs: Hackett 6 Asts: Hackett 5 PIR: Mickey 15	Boxscore	Pts: Loyd 24; Rebs: Motiejūnas, James 6 Asts: Motiejūnas 2 PIR: James 21	Arena: Segafredo Arena; Attendance: 9,385; Referees: Tomislav Hordov, Milan Nedović, Sašo Petek

9 February 2024	Barcelona (Spanish Basketball Federation)	93–77	(German Basketball Federation) ALBA Berlin	Barcelona
20:30 (CET)	Scoring by quarter: 31–26, 20–13, 29–12, 13–26
	Pts: Hernangómez 18; Rebs: da Silva 10; Asts: Kalinić 5 PIR: Hernangómez 26	Boxscore	Pts: Schneider 14; Rebs: Spagnolo 5 Asts: three players 2 PIR: Schneider 14	Arena: Palau Blaugrana; Attendance: 6,976; Referees: Milivoje Jovčić, Ioannis Foufis, Michele Rossi

=== Round 27 ===
29 February 2024	ALBA Berlin (German Basketball Federation)	71–106	(Israeli Basketball Association) Maccabi Playtika Tel Aviv	Berlin
20:00 (CET)	Scoring by quarter: 15–27, 23–30, 18–30, 15–19
	Pts: Thiemann 14; Rebs: Thiemann 5 Asts: Hermannsson 4 PIR: Thiemann 16	Boxscore	Pts: Webb 17; Rebs: Webb 6 Asts: Brown 6 PIR: Baldwin 28	Arena: Mercedes-Benz Arena; Attendance: 7,752; Referees: Carlos Peruga, Carlos Cortés, Vasiliki Tsaroucha

29 February 2024	Virtus Segafredo Bologna (Italian Basketball Federation)	87–74	(Spanish Basketball Federation) Valencia Basket	Bologna
20:30 (CET)	Scoring by quarter: 18–20, 26–12, 21–25, 22–17
	Pts: Belinelli 16; Rebs: Mickey 7 Asts: Pajola 6 PIR: Mickey 20	Boxscore	Pts: Jones 20; Rebs: Ojeleye 6 Asts: Pangos 5 PIR: Jones 22	Arena: Segafredo Arena; Attendance: 9,522; Referees: Damir Javor, Uroš Nikolić, Rain Peerandi

29 February 2024	Partizan Mozzart Bet (Basketball Federation of Serbia)	100–90	(Turkish Basketball Federation) Anadolu Efes	Belgrade
20:30 (CET)	Scoring by quarter: 17–20, 26–20, 21–19, 36–31
	Pts: Avramović 30; Rebs: LeDay 8 Asts: Ponitka 4 PIR: Avramović 32	Boxscore	Pts: Clyburn 17; Rebs: Larkin 5 Asts: Larkin 6 PIR: Clyburn, Larkin 21	Arena: Štark Arena; Attendance: 20,200; Referees: Mehdi Difallah, Gytis Vilius, Kristaps Konstantinovs

29 February 2024	Real Madrid (Spanish Basketball Federation)	86–97	(Hellenic Basketball Federation) Panathinaikos AKTOR	Madrid
20:45 (CET)	Scoring by quarter: 24–18, 12–27, 25–22, 25–30
	Pts: Yabusele 18; Rebs: Poirier 7 Asts: Campazzo 7 PIR: Yabusele 24	Boxscore	Pts: Lessort 26; Rebs: Mitoglou 9 Asts: Nunn 7 PIR: Lessort 33	Arena: WiZink Center; Attendance: 10,828; Referees: Matej Boltauzer, Emin Moğulkoç, Joseph Bissang

1 March 2024	Fenerbahçe Beko (Turkish Basketball Federation)	111–96	(Spanish Basketball Federation) Baskonia	Istanbul
18:45 (CET)	Scoring by quarter: 32–34, 23–20, 23–24, 33–18
	Pts: Hayes-Davis 19; Rebs: Motley 5 Asts: Calathes 12; PIR: Calathes 25	Boxscore	Pts: Marinković 18; Rebs: Díez 6 Asts: Miller-McIntyre 10; PIR: Díez 23	Arena: Ülker Sports and Event Hall; Attendance: 10,730; Referees: Robert Lottermoser, Tomislav Hordov, Artūras Šukys

1 March 2024	Žalgiris (Lithuanian Basketball Federation)	76–95	(Hellenic Basketball Federation) Olympiacos	Kaunas
19:00 (CET)	Scoring by quarter: 20–23, 19–18, 17–28, 20–26
	Pts: Evans 18; Rebs: three players 5 Asts: Dimša 5 PIR: Evans 16	Boxscore	Pts: Walkup 22; Rebs: Fall 6 Asts: Walkup 7 PIR: McKissic 26	Arena: Žalgirio Arena; Attendance: 15,222; Referees: Ilija Belošević, Milan Nedović, Alberto Baena

1 March 2024	LDLC ASVEL (French Federation of Basketball)	81–77	(Italian Basketball Federation) EA7 Emporio Armani Milan	Décines-Charpieu
20:00 (CET)	Scoring by quarter: 22–13, 17–22, 23–21, 19–21
	Pts: Lauvergne 17; Rebs: N'Diaye 6 Asts: Kahudi, de Colo 4 PIR: Lauvergne 20	Boxscore	Pts: Hall 19; Rebs: Shields 9 Asts: three players 3 PIR: Hall 20	Arena: LDLC Arena; Attendance: 8,684; Referees: Fernando Rocha, Emilio Pérez, Anne Panther

1 March 2024	Bayern Munich (German Basketball Federation)	74–66	(Basketball Federation of Serbia) Crvena zvezda Meridianbet	Munich
20:30 (CET)	Scoring by quarter: 20–19, 12–8, 21–19, 21–20
	Pts: Booker 22; Rebs: Ibaka 8 Asts: Weiler-Babb 5 PIR: Ibaka 22	Boxscore	Pts: Smart 13; Rebs: Bolomboy 9 Asts: dos Santos 5 PIR: Bolomboy 18	Arena: BMW Park; Attendance: 6,147; Referees: Miguel Ángel Pérez, Ioannis Foufis, Robert Vyklický

1 March 2024	Barcelona (Spanish Basketball Federation)	67–77	(French Federation of Basketball) AS Monaco	Barcelona
20:30 (CET)	Scoring by quarter: 21–12, 14–21, 16–27, 16–17
	Pts: Veselý 19; Rebs: Veselý 10; Asts: Satoranský 4 PIR: Veselý 32	Boxscore	Pts: James 17; Rebs: James 8 Asts: James, Okobo 4 PIR: Hall 20	Arena: Palau Blaugrana; Attendance: 7,045; Referees: Sreten Radović, Seffi Shemmesh, Sašo Petek

=== Round 28 ===
7 March 2024	Anadolu Efes (Turkish Basketball Federation)	109–86	(German Basketball Federation) Bayern Munich	Istanbul
18:30 (CET)	Scoring by quarter: 26–28, 27–21, 35–16, 21–21
	Pts: Larkin 28; Rebs: Jones, Willis 5 Asts: Bryant, Larkin 4 PIR: Larkin 33	Boxscore	Pts: Edwards 19; Rebs: Ibaka 6 Asts: Bolmaro, Lučić 4 PIR: Ibaka 23	Arena: Sinan Erdem Dome; Attendance: 14,768; Referees: Matej Boltauzer, Rain Peerandi, Marcin Kowalski

7 March 2024	AS Monaco (French Federation of Basketball)	98–80	(Basketball Federation of Serbia) Crvena zvezda Meridianbet	Fontvieille
19:00 (CET)	Scoring by quarter: 25–17, 21–21, 23–22, 29–20
	Pts: James 20; Rebs: Motiejūnas 6 Asts: Okobo 7 PIR: Okobo 20	Boxscore	Pts: Mitrović 18; Rebs: Mitrović 10; Asts: dos Santos 5 PIR: Mitrović, Bolomboy 21	Arena: Salle Gaston Médecin; Attendance: 4,313; Referees: Carlos Peruga, Carmelo Paternicò, Saulius Račys, Luka Kardum

7 March 2024	Maccabi Playtika Tel Aviv (Israeli Basketball Association)	83–76	(Lithuanian Basketball Federation) Žalgiris	Belgrade
20:05 (CET)	Scoring by quarter: 21–21, 21–19, 14–22, 27–14
	Pts: Baldwin 16; Rebs: Nebo 9 Asts: Brown 10; PIR: Colson 19	Boxscore	Pts: Evans 18; Rebs: Manek 6 Asts: Evans, Ulanovas 4 PIR: Evans 28	Arena: Aleksandar Nikolić Hall; Attendance: 0 Referees: Miguel Ángel Pérez, Saša Pukl, Anne Panther

7 March 2024	Valencia Basket (Spanish Basketball Federation)	78–88	(Spanish Basketball Federation) Barcelona	Valencia
20:30 (CET)	Scoring by quarter: 18–18, 24–19, 15–22, 21–29
	Pts: Ojeleye 19; Rebs: Inglis 6 Asts: Harper 4 PIR: Jones 19	Boxscore	Pts: Veselý 21; Rebs: Satoranský 8 Asts: Laprovíttola 7 PIR: Veselý 25	Arena: La Fonteta; Attendance: 7,437; Referees: Robert Lottermoser, Milan Nedović, Gentian Cici

7 March 2024	Real Madrid (Spanish Basketball Federation)	79–89	(Turkish Basketball Federation) Fenerbahçe Beko	Madrid
20:45 (CET)	Scoring by quarter: 15–20, 18–23, 25–24, 21–22
	Pts: Llull 17; Rebs: Tavares, Yabusele 6 Asts: Campazzo 5 PIR: Musa 20	Boxscore	Pts: Hayes-Davis 17; Rebs: Hayes-Davis 12; Asts: Calathes 6 PIR: Hayes-Davis 26	Arena: WiZink Center; Attendance: 10,127; Referees: Damir Javor, Mehdi Difallah, Milivoje Jovčić

7 March 2024	Olympiacos (Hellenic Basketball Federation)	74–69	(Italian Basketball Federation) Virtus Segafredo Bologna	Piraeus
21:00 (CET)	Scoring by quarter: 21–22, 16–24, 20–5, 17–18
	Pts: Papanikolaou 16; Rebs: Papanikolaou 8 Asts: Williams-Goss 4 PIR: Papanikolaou 22	Boxscore	Pts: Shengelia 15; Rebs: Shengelia, Mickey 6 Asts: Shengelia, Cordinier 4 PIR: Shengelia 22	Arena: Peace and Friendship Stadium; Attendance: 12,239; Referees: Fernando Rocha, Emilio Pérez, Sašo Petek

8 March 2024	Panathinaikos AKTOR (Hellenic Basketball Federation)	85–67	(French Federation of Basketball) LDLC ASVEL	Marousi
20:15 (CET)	Scoring by quarter: 20–17, 18–19, 21–14, 26–17
	Pts: Grant 21; Rebs: Grigonis, Mitoglou 7 Asts: Sloukas 8 PIR: Lessort, Grant 25	Boxscore	Pts: de Colo 15; Rebs: Thomas 5 Asts: de Colo 5 PIR: de Colo 25	Arena: OAKA Altion; Attendance: 14,519; Referees: Ilija Belošević, Tomislav Hordov, Robert Vyklický

8 March 2024	Baskonia (Spanish Basketball Federation)	88–71	(German Basketball Federation) ALBA Berlin	Vitoria-Gasteiz
20:30 (CET)	Scoring by quarter: 23–10, 19–24, 21–13, 25–24
	Pts: Moneke 16; Rebs: Costello 9 Asts: Miller-McIntyre 10; PIR: Miller-McIntyre 25	Boxscore	Pts: Koumadje, Thomas 12; Rebs: Olinde, Samar 6 Asts: Hermannsson 8 PIR: Koumadje 18	Arena: Buesa Arena; Attendance: 8,226; Referees: Sreten Radović, Jakub Zamojski, Michele Rossi

8 March 2024	EA7 Emporio Armani Milan (Italian Basketball Federation)	85–83	(Basketball Federation of Serbia) Partizan Mozzart Bet	Assago
20:30 (CET)	Scoring by quarter: 22–21, 19–19, 23–27, 21–16
	Pts: Mirotić, Shields 19; Rebs: Voigtmann 7 Asts: Shields 6 PIR: Shields 27	Boxscore	Pts: Avramović 19; Rebs: Caboclo 5 Asts: Avramović 3 PIR: Avramović 18	Arena: Forum; Attendance: 12,016; Referees: Emin Moğulkoç, Joseph Bissang, Carlos Cortés

=== Round 29 ===
14 March 2024	Olympiacos (Hellenic Basketball Federation)	71–65	(Hellenic Basketball Federation) Panathinaikos AKTOR	Piraeus
18:45 (CET)	Scoring by quarter: 7–17, 26–16, 15–9, 23–23
	Pts: Wright 19; Rebs: Peters, Walkup 5 Asts: Walkup 6 PIR: Wright 22	Boxscore	Pts: Nunn 17; Rebs: Mitoglou 16; Asts: Sloukas 3 PIR: Mitoglou 20	Arena: Peace and Friendship Stadium; Attendance: 11,991; Referees: Sreten Radović, Carlos Peruga, Uroš Nikolić

14 March 2024	Fenerbahçe Beko (Turkish Basketball Federation)	118–88	(Spanish Basketball Federation) Valencia Basket	Istanbul
18:45 (CET)	Scoring by quarter: 22–19, 35–18, 28–24, 33–27
	Pts: Dorsey 28; Rebs: Biberović 6 Asts: Calathes 9 PIR: Dorsey 23	Boxscore	Pts: Davies 18; Rebs: Davies 5 Asts: Harper, Jović 4 PIR: Davies 29	Arena: Ülker Sports and Event Hall; Attendance: 8,107; Referees: Ilija Belošević, Ioannis Foufis, Aare Halliko

14 March 2024	Crvena zvezda Meridianbet (Basketball Federation of Serbia)	80–84	(Israeli Basketball Association) Maccabi Playtika Tel Aviv	Belgrade
19:00 (CET)	Scoring by quarter: 21–17, 26–14, 14–22, 19–31
	Pts: dos Santos 20; Rebs: Bolomboy 8 Asts: Hanga, dos Santos 7 PIR: dos Santos 17	Boxscore	Pts: Colson 23; Rebs: Nebo 13; Asts: Brown, Baldwin 5 PIR: Nebo 33	Arena: Štark Arena; Attendance: 12,537; Referees: Fernando Rocha, Gytis Vilius, Sašo Petek

14 March 2024	ALBA Berlin (German Basketball Federation)	82–90	(French Federation of Basketball) AS Monaco	Berlin
20:00 (CET)	Scoring by quarter: 27–13, 12–32, 23–24, 20–21
	Pts: Thomas 14; Rebs: Thiemann 7 Asts: Brown, Thomas 4 PIR: Thomas 18	Boxscore	Pts: Okobo 21; Rebs: Hall 6 Asts: James 4 PIR: Okobo 24	Arena: Mercedes-Benz Arena; Attendance: 7,422; Referees: Damir Javor, Igor Dragojević, Jurgis Laurinavičius

14 March 2024	Baskonia (Spanish Basketball Federation)	88–73	(Italian Basketball Federation) EA7 Emporio Armani Milan	Vitoria-Gasteiz
20:30 (CET)	Scoring by quarter: 19–18, 29–16, 21–21, 19–18
	Pts: Howard 26; Rebs: Sedekerskis 7 Asts: Miller-McIntyre 5 PIR: Moneke 27	Boxscore	Pts: Mirotić 21; Rebs: Mirotić 8 Asts: Melli 5 PIR: Mirotić 27	Arena: Buesa Arena; Attendance: 8,090; Referees: Matej Boltauzer, Mehdi Difallah, Rain Peerandi

14 March 2024	Barcelona (Spanish Basketball Federation)	94–76	(Basketball Federation of Serbia) Partizan Mozzart Bet	Barcelona
20:30 (CET)	Scoring by quarter: 29–24, 22–24, 23–20, 20–8
	Pts: Laprovíttola 17; Rebs: Rubio 6 Asts: Rubio 6 PIR: Veselý 17	Boxscore	Pts: Avramović 27; Rebs: LeDay 6 Asts: Avramović, Punter 3 PIR: Avramović 25	Arena: Palau Blaugrana; Attendance: 7,047; Referees: Oļegs Latiševs, Piotr Pastusiak, Artūras Šukys

15 March 2024	LDLC ASVEL (French Federation of Basketball)	84–80	(Turkish Basketball Federation) Anadolu Efes	Décines-Charpieu
20:00 (CET)	Scoring by quarter: 19–16, 27–23, 19–13, 19–28
	Pts: Luwawu-Cabarrot 21; Rebs: Luwawu-Cabarrot 6 Asts: de Colo 9 PIR: Thomas 27	Boxscore	Pts: Clyburn 16; Rebs: Clyburn, Jones 5 Asts: Larkin 4 PIR: Larkin 19	Arena: LDLC Arena; Attendance: 8,256; Referees: Juan Carlos Garcia, Sasa Pukl, Seffi Shemmesh

15 March 2024	Bayern Munich (German Basketball Federation)	64–58	(Lithuanian Basketball Federation) Žalgiris	Munich
20:30 (CET)	Scoring by quarter: 18–10, 15–11, 17–16, 14–21
	Pts: Booker 20; Rebs: Ibaka, Booker 6 Asts: Weiler-Babb, Bolmaro 3 PIR: Booker 22	Boxscore	Pts: Evans 21; Rebs: Hayes 9 Asts: Lekavičius 3 PIR: Hayes 13	Arena: BMW Park; Attendance: 6,355; Referees: Emin Moğulkoç, Miloš Koljenšić, Luka Kardum

15 March 2024	Virtus Segafredo Bologna (Italian Basketball Federation)	74–89	(Spanish Basketball Federation) Real Madrid	Bologna
20:30 (CET)	Scoring by quarter: 15–23, 16–21, 21–17, 22–28
	Pts: Cordinier 12; Rebs: Cordinier 8 Asts: Belinelli 5 PIR: Cordinier 16	Boxscore	Pts: Yabusele 15; Rebs: Poirier 8 Asts: Campazzo 4 PIR: Poirier 24	Arena: Segafredo Arena; Attendance: 9,517; Referees: Robert Lottermoser, Milan Nedović, Eduard Udyanskyy

=== Round 30 ===
19 March 2024	Anadolu Efes (Turkish Basketball Federation)	85–72	(Hellenic Basketball Federation) Olympiacos	Istanbul
18:30 (CET)	Scoring by quarter: 26–21, 22–16, 18–24, 19–11
	Pts: Larkin 15; Rebs: Oturu 5 Asts: Larkin 6 PIR: Bryant 17	Boxscore	Pts: Peters 19; Rebs: Peters, Papanikolaou 5 Asts: Walkup 10; PIR: Papanikolaou 20	Arena: Sinan Erdem Dome; Attendance: 14,367; Referees: Ilija Belošević, Milan Nedović, Alberto Baena

19 March 2024	Žalgiris (Lithuanian Basketball Federation)	96–81	(Italian Basketball Federation) Virtus Segafredo Bologna	Kaunas
19:00 (CET)	Scoring by quarter: 22–22, 21–27, 25–14, 28–18
	Pts: Sumner 16; Rebs: Hayes 6 Asts: Evans 7 PIR: Hayes 26	Boxscore	Pts: Shengelia 19; Rebs: Abass, Dunston 4 Asts: Pajola 7 PIR: Shengelia 23	Arena: Žalgirio Arena; Attendance: 12,881; Referees: Sreten Radović, Mehdi Difallah, Jordi Aliaga

19 March 2024	ALBA Berlin (German Basketball Federation)	79–86	(Spanish Basketball Federation) Real Madrid	Berlin
20:00 (CET)	Scoring by quarter: 26–16, 14–20, 17–22, 22–28
	Pts: Thomas 16; Rebs: Koumadje 6 Asts: Hermannsson 5 PIR: Thomas 17	Boxscore	Pts: Hezonja 22; Rebs: Hezonja 8 Asts: Campazzo 6 PIR: Hezonja 28	Arena: Mercedes-Benz Arena; Attendance: 11,240; Referees: Tomislav Hordov, Miloš Koljenšić, Sašo Petek

19 March 2024	Maccabi Playtika Tel Aviv (Israeli Basketball Association)	98–90	(French Federation of Basketball) LDLC ASVEL	Belgrade
20:05 (CET)	Scoring by quarter: 23–21, 24–28, 19–20, 32–21
	Pts: Baldwin 30; Rebs: Nebo 10; Asts: Baldwin 10; PIR: Baldwin 46	Boxscore	Pts: de Colo 18; Rebs: Fall 12; Asts: de Colo 5 PIR: Fall 31	Arena: Aleksandar Nikolić Hall; Attendance: 0 Referees: Carmelo Paternicò, Emilio Pérez, Jakub Zamojski

19 March 2024	Partizan Mozzart Bet (Basketball Federation of Serbia)	87–83	(Spanish Basketball Federation) Baskonia	Belgrade
20:30 (CET)	Scoring by quarter: 23–16, 21–26, 25–18, 18–23
	Pts: Kaminsky 20; Rebs: Caboclo 13; Asts: Punter 6 PIR: Caboclo 28	Boxscore	Pts: Howard 26; Rebs: Costello 7 Asts: Miller-McIntyre 6 PIR: Costello 18	Arena: Štark Arena; Attendance: 20,174; Referees: Robert Lottermoser, Gytis Vilius, Robert Vyklický

20 March 2024	Fenerbahçe Beko (Turkish Basketball Federation)	88–74	(Spanish Basketball Federation) Barcelona	Istanbul
18:45 (CET)	Scoring by quarter: 23–11, 23–14, 16–32, 26–17
	Pts: Wilbekin 18; Rebs: Motley 6 Asts: Gudurić 4 PIR: Hayes-Davis 26	Boxscore	Pts: Brizuela 18; Rebs: da Silva 7 Asts: Laprovíttola 7 PIR: Hernangómez 14	Arena: Ülker Sports and Event Hall; Attendance: 12,960; Referees: Matej Boltauzer, Joseph Bissang, Luka Kardum

20 March 2024	AS Monaco (French Federation of Basketball)	80–98	(Italian Basketball Federation) EA7 Emporio Armani Milan	Fontvieille
19:00 (CET)	Scoring by quarter: 20–27, 24–31, 23–18, 13–22
	Pts: Diallo 17; Rebs: James 6 Asts: Okobo 5 PIR: Diallo 19	Boxscore	Pts: Mirotić 21; Rebs: three players 6 Asts: Hall 7 PIR: Mirotić 22	Arena: Salle Gaston Médecin; Attendance: 4,112; Referees: Miguel Ángel Pérez, Uroš Nikolić, Ioannis Foufis

20 March 2024	Crvena zvezda Meridianbet (Basketball Federation of Serbia)	76–89	(Hellenic Basketball Federation) Panathinaikos AKTOR	Belgrade
20:00 (CET)	Scoring by quarter: 20–29, 21–22, 15–19, 20–19
	Pts: Davidovac, Nedović 19; Rebs: Bolomboy 8 Asts: Nedović 7 PIR: Nedović 23	Boxscore	Pts: Lessort 19; Rebs: Mitoglou 9 Asts: Sloukas 10; PIR: Lessort 30	Arena: Štark Arena; Attendance: 13,126; Referees: Juan Carlos García, Piotr Pastusiak, Kristaps Konstantinovs

20 March 2024	Valencia Basket (Spanish Basketball Federation)	70–68	(German Basketball Federation) Bayern Munich	Valencia
20:30 (CET)	Scoring by quarter: 28–15, 17–22, 12–19, 13–12
	Pts: Jones 19; Rebs: Pradilla 8 Asts: Inglis, Jones 3 PIR: Inglis 18	Boxscore	Pts: Booker 16; Rebs: Booker 6 Asts: Weiler-Babb 4 PIR: Francisco 14	Arena: La Fonteta; Attendance: 5,764; Referees: Damir Javor, Milivoje Jovčić, Artūras Šukys

=== Round 31 ===
21 March 2024	Anadolu Efes (Turkish Basketball Federation)	85–84	(German Basketball Federation) ALBA Berlin	Istanbul
18:30 (CET)	Scoring by quarter: 23–23, 30–17, 12–27, 20–17
	Pts: Bryant 24; Rebs: Bryant 5 Asts: Hollatz, Bryant 4 PIR: Bryant 33	Boxscore	Pts: Olinde, Thomas 17; Rebs: Koumadje 10; Asts: Hermannsson 7 PIR: Olinde 16	Arena: Sinan Erdem Dome; Attendance: 10,057; Referees: Oļegs Latiševs, Sérgio Silva, Vasiliki Tsaroucha

21 March 2024	Žalgiris (Lithuanian Basketball Federation)	94–76	(Spanish Basketball Federation) Baskonia	Kaunas
19:00 (CET)	Scoring by quarter: 25–17, 23–17, 23–23, 23–19
	Pts: Evans 20; Rebs: Hayes, Ulanovas 7 Asts: Evans 4 PIR: Hayes, Evans 20	Boxscore	Pts: Miller-McIntyre 16; Rebs: Moneke, Costello 6 Asts: Miller-McIntyre 7 PIR: Moneke 18	Arena: Žalgirio Arena; Attendance: 14,787; Referees: Ilija Belošević, Igor Dragojević, Amit Balak

21 March 2024	Olympiacos (Hellenic Basketball Federation)	80–64	(French Federation of Basketball) LDLC ASVEL	Piraeus
20:15 (CET)	Scoring by quarter: 20–12, 23–23, 11–20, 26–9
	Pts: Peters 17; Rebs: three players 6 Asts: Williams-Goss 5 PIR: M. Fall 25	Boxscore	Pts: Luwawu-Cabarrot 14; Rebs: Y. Fall 5 Asts: Lee 5 PIR: Lee 13	Arena: Peace and Friendship Stadium; Attendance: 9,887; Referees: Robert Lottermoser, Tomasz Trawicki, Mario Majkić

21 March 2024	Partizan Mozzart Bet (Basketball Federation of Serbia)	76–88	(Spanish Basketball Federation) Real Madrid	Belgrade
20:30 (CET)	Scoring by quarter: 13–13, 18–20, 23–35, 22–20
	Pts: Kaminsky 19; Rebs: Punter 7 Asts: Nunnally, Punter 3 PIR: Nunnally 21	Boxscore	Pts: Hezonja 25; Rebs: Poirier 8 Asts: Campazzo 8 PIR: Hezonja 33	Arena: Štark Arena; Attendance: 20,200; Referees: Fernando Rocha, Jakub Zamojski, Rain Peerandi

22 March 2024	Crvena zvezda Meridianbet (Basketball Federation of Serbia)	94–79	(Italian Basketball Federation) Virtus Segafredo Bologna	Belgrade
19:00 (CET)	Scoring by quarter: 21–23, 27–19, 26–23, 20–14
	Pts: Nedović 25; Rebs: Hanga 7 Asts: Teodosić 9 PIR: Nedović 30	Boxscore	Pts: Shengelia 25; Rebs: Abass, Dunston 6 Asts: Shengelia 5 PIR: Lundberg 20	Arena: Štark Arena; Attendance: 12,708; Referees: Emin Moğulkoç, Carlos Cortés, Saulius Račys

22 March 2024	AS Monaco (French Federation of Basketball)	79–78	(Spanish Basketball Federation) Valencia Basket	Fontvieille
19:00 (CET)	Scoring by quarter: 25–15, 13–19, 19–20, 22–24
	Pts: James, Blossomgame 17; Rebs: Hall 5 Asts: Strazel 6 PIR: Blossomgame 19	Boxscore	Pts: Ojeleye 22; Rebs: Ojeleye, Inglis 6 Asts: Jović 6 PIR: Ojeleye 30	Arena: Salle Gaston Médecin; Attendance: 4,309; Referees: Sreten Radović, Saša Pukl, Anne Panther

22 March 2024	Panathinaikos AKTOR (Hellenic Basketball Federation)	89–81	(Spanish Basketball Federation) Barcelona	Marousi
20:15 (CET)	Scoring by quarter: 20–23, 14–23, 26–15, 29–20
	Pts: Nunn 22; Rebs: Mitoglou 10; Asts: Sloukas 8 PIR: Sloukas 25	Boxscore	Pts: Veselý, Hernangómez 13; Rebs: Satoranský, Hernangómez 5 Asts: Satoranský 6 PIR: Satoranský 20	Arena: OAKA Altion; Attendance: 17,948; Referees: Mehdi Difallah, Gytis Vilius, Michele Rossi

22 March 2024	Bayern Munich (German Basketball Federation)	74–89	(Israeli Basketball Association) Maccabi Playtika Tel Aviv	Munich
20:30 (CET)	Scoring by quarter: 21–22, 14–26, 27–15, 12–26
	Pts: Bolmaro 21; Rebs: Ibaka 8 Asts: Bolmaro, Ibaka 3 PIR: Ibaka 19	Boxscore	Pts: Rivero 17; Rebs: Nebo 7 Asts: Blatt 6 PIR: Rivero 19	Arena: BMW Park; Attendance: 6,347; Referees: Matej Boltauzer, Uroš Nikolić, Josip Radojković

22 March 2024	EA7 Emporio Armani Milan (Italian Basketball Federation)	77–76	(Turkish Basketball Federation) Fenerbahçe Beko	Assago
20:30 (CET)	Scoring by quarter: 28–18, 15–18, 16–15, 18–25
	Pts: Melli 17; Rebs: Mirotić 7 Asts: Shields 5 PIR: Shields 23	Boxscore	Pts: Wilbekin 15; Rebs: Gudurić 5 Asts: Gudurić, Calathes 6 PIR: Gudurić 19	Arena: Forum; Attendance: 11,214; Referees: Carlos Peruga, Milan Nedović, Maxime Boubert

=== Round 32 ===
27 March 2024	Maccabi Playtika Tel Aviv (Israeli Basketball Association)	95–80	(Spanish Basketball Federation) Valencia Basket	Belgrade
20:30 (CET)	Scoring by quarter: 21–20, 27–18, 23–20, 24–22
	Pts: Baldwin 17; Rebs: Nebo 9 Asts: Brown 7 PIR: Nebo, Baldwin 23	Boxscore	Pts: Ojeleye 15; Rebs: Inglis 9 Asts: Jones 5 PIR: Inglis 14	Arena: Aleksandar Nikolić Hall; Attendance: 200; Referees: Emin Moğulkoç, Tomislav Hordov, Uroš Obrknežević

28 March 2024	Žalgiris (Lithuanian Basketball Federation)	87–73	(Italian Basketball Federation) EA7 Emporio Armani Milan	Kaunas
19:00 (CET)	Scoring by quarter: 14–17, 21–20, 24–17, 28–19
	Pts: Evans 20; Rebs: Birutis 7 Asts: Ulanovas, Sumner 5 PIR: Sumner 28	Boxscore	Pts: Mirotić 19; Rebs: Mirotić 7 Asts: Lô 4 PIR: Mirotić 23	Arena: Žalgirio Arena; Attendance: 15,139; Referees: Fernando Rocha, Piotr Pastusiak, Seffi Shemmesh

28 March 2024	Bayern Munich (German Basketball Federation)	79–87	(Spanish Basketball Federation) Barcelona	Munich
20:30 (CET)	Scoring by quarter: 19–25, 11–22, 23–24, 26–16
	Pts: Weiler-Babb, Ibaka 17; Rebs: Ibaka 12; Asts: Francisco, Bolmaro 5 PIR: Ibaka 23	Boxscore	Pts: Parker 15; Rebs: Hernangómez 8 Asts: Satoranský 7 PIR: Parker 18	Arena: BMW Park; Attendance: 6,396; Referees: Ilija Belošević, Milan Nedović, Amit Balak

28 March 2024	Partizan Mozzart Bet (Basketball Federation of Serbia)	69–74	(Hellenic Basketball Federation) Olympiacos	Belgrade
20:30 (CET)	Scoring by quarter: 22–17, 18–15, 19–14, 10–28
	Pts: Punter 19; Rebs: Dozier 9 Asts: Kaminsky, Punter 5 PIR: Punter 20	Boxscore	Pts: Williams-Goss 17; Rebs: Fall, Larentzakis 4 Asts: Williams-Goss, Walkup 3 PIR: Williams-Goss 19	Arena: Štark Arena; Attendance: 20,186; Referees: Juan Carlos García, Mehdi Difallah, Carlos Cortés

28 March 2024	Baskonia (Spanish Basketball Federation)	76–97	(Turkish Basketball Federation) Anadolu Efes	Vitoria-Gasteiz
20:30 (CET)	Scoring by quarter: 22–32, 23–17, 8–28, 23–20
	Pts: Howard 15; Rebs: Moneke 7 Asts: Chiozza 5 PIR: Kotsar, Moneke 11	Boxscore	Pts: Larkin 28; Rebs: Hollatz 6 Asts: Bryant 4 PIR: Larkin 29	Arena: Buesa Arena; Attendance: 10,890; Referees: Sreten Radović, Uroš Nikolić, Sašo Petek

28 March 2024	LDLC ASVEL (French Federation of Basketball)	77–87	(French Federation of Basketball) AS Monaco	Décines-Charpieu
21:00 (CET)	Scoring by quarter: 12–23, 28–21, 21–12, 16–31
	Pts: Luwawu-Cabarrot 23; Rebs: Fall, Luwawu-Cabarrot 7 Asts: de Colo 9 PIR: Luwawu-Cabarrot 29	Boxscore	Pts: Okobo 16; Rebs: Diallo, Hall 6 Asts: James 4 PIR: Diallo 26	Arena: LDLC Arena; Attendance: 8,907; Referees: Carlos Peruga, Sérgio Silva, Leandro Lezcano

29 March 2024	Fenerbahçe Beko (Turkish Basketball Federation)	103–68	(German Basketball Federation) ALBA Berlin	Istanbul
18:45 (CET)	Scoring by quarter: 34–18, 18–22, 31–13, 20–15
	Pts: Hayes-Davis 50; Rebs: Motley 5 Asts: Calathes 7 PIR: Hayes 46	Boxscore	Pts: Brown 17; Rebs: Bean 7 Asts: Samar 3 PIR: Brown 17	Arena: Ülker Sports and Event Hall; Attendance: 10,781; Referees: Milivoje Jovčić, Gytis Vilius, Eduard Udyanskyy

29 March 2024	Real Madrid (Spanish Basketball Federation)	101–94	(Basketball Federation of Serbia) Crvena zvezda Meridianbet	Madrid
20:30 (CET)	Scoring by quarter: 20–21, 24–26, 28–28, 29–19
	Pts: Musa 30; Rebs: Tavares 11; Asts: Rodríguez, Llull 6 PIR: Musa 40	Boxscore	Pts: Nedović 30; Rebs: Hanga 6 Asts: Hanga 7 PIR: Nedović 32	Arena: WiZink Center; Attendance: 9,189; Referees: Matej Boltauzer, Artūras Šukys, Maxime Boubert

29 March 2024	Virtus Segafredo Bologna (Italian Basketball Federation)	79–81	(Hellenic Basketball Federation) Panathinaikos AKTOR	Bologna
20:30 (CET)	Scoring by quarter: 16–28, 23–23, 20–14, 20–16
	Pts: Shengelia 19; Rebs: Pajola 6 Asts: Pajola 7 PIR: Shengelia 25	Boxscore	Pts: Sloukas 20; Rebs: Lessort 9 Asts: Nunn 5 PIR: Sloukas, Grant 21	Arena: Segafredo Arena; Attendance: 9,512; Referees: Damir Javor, Emilio Pérez, Joseph Bissang

=== Round 33 ===
4 April 2024	Crvena zvezda Meridianbet (Basketball Federation of Serbia)	86–89	(Hellenic Basketball Federation) Olympiacos	Belgrade
19:00 (CEST)	Scoring by quarter: 14–23, 25–19, 25–21, 22–26
	Pts: Hanga, Bolomboy 19; Rebs: Bolomboy 12; Asts: Teodosić 8 PIR: Bolomboy 32	Boxscore	Pts: Wright 20; Rebs: Fall 5 Asts: three players 6 PIR: Wright 25	Arena: Štark Arena; Attendance: 15,456; Referees: Carlos Peruga, Gytis Vilius, Rain Peerandi

4 April 2024	AS Monaco (French Federation of Basketball)	69–66	(Lithuanian Basketball Federation) Žalgiris	Fontvieille
19:00 (CEST)	Scoring by quarter: 20–11, 19–18, 12–15, 18–22
	Pts: James 18; Rebs: Brown 8 Asts: Okobo, James 3 PIR: Motiejūnas 19	Boxscore	Pts: Evans 17; Rebs: Ulanovas 8 Asts: Evans, Sumner 5 PIR: Hayes 20	Arena: Salle Gaston Médecin; Attendance: 4,088; Referees: Juan Carlos García, Emin Moğulkoç, Mario Majkić

4 April 2024	Barcelona (Spanish Basketball Federation)	92–89	(Israeli Basketball Association) Maccabi Playtika Tel Aviv	Barcelona
20:30 (CEST)	Scoring by quarter: 19–19, 25–24, 26–20, 22–26
	Pts: Veselý, Abrines 17; Rebs: Satoranský 11; Asts: Laprovíttola 9 PIR: Laprovíttola 20	Boxscore	Pts: Baldwin 22; Rebs: Nebo 9 Asts: Blatt 9 PIR: Nebo 20	Arena: Palau Blaugrana; Attendance: 7,258; Referees: Damir Javor, Saša Pukl, Robert Vyklický

4 April 2024	ALBA Berlin (German Basketball Federation)	83–94	(Basketball Federation of Serbia) Partizan Mozzart Bet	Berlin
20:30 (CEST)	Scoring by quarter: 15–23, 19–24, 28–25, 21–22
	Pts: Thiemann 20; Rebs: Thiemann 11; Asts: Hermannsson 8 PIR: Thiemann 29	Boxscore	Pts: Nunnally 19; Rebs: Punter, LeDay 6 Asts: Nunnally, Dozier 4 PIR: Punter 21	Arena: Uber Arena; Attendance: 11,509; Referees: Emilio Pérez, Ioannis Foufis, Kristaps Konstantinovs

4 April 2024	Valencia Basket (Spanish Basketball Federation)	69–98	(French Federation of Basketball) LDLC ASVEL	Valencia
20:45 (CEST)	Scoring by quarter: 19–27, 19–25, 7–27, 24–19
	Pts: Jones 18; Rebs: Pradilla 6 Asts: four players 2 PIR: Jones 21	Boxscore	Pts: Lauvergne 21; Rebs: Fall 10; Asts: de Colo 5 PIR: Lauvergne 27	Arena: La Fonteta; Attendance: 6,020; Referees: Carmelo Paternicò, Piotr Pastusiak, Amit Balak

5 April 2024	Fenerbahçe Beko (Turkish Basketball Federation)	80–82	(Turkish Basketball Federation) Anadolu Efes	Istanbul
19:45 (CEST)	Scoring by quarter: 13–16, 23–16, 16–19, 28–31
	Pts: Wilbekin 17; Rebs: Hayes-Davis, Papagiannis 8 Asts: Calathes, Wilbekin 3 PIR: Gudurić, Papagiannis 15	Boxscore	Pts: Clyburn 21; Rebs: Clyburn 5 Asts: Larkin 5 PIR: Clyburn 28	Arena: Ülker Sports and Event Hall; Attendance: 12,417; Referees: Ilija Belošević, Jordi Aliaga, Artūras Šukys

5 April 2024	Real Madrid (Spanish Basketball Federation)	91–95	(Spanish Basketball Federation) Baskonia	Madrid
20:30 (CEST)	Scoring by quarter: 27–17, 21–25, 16–23, 27–30
	Pts: Hezonja 18; Rebs: Hezonja 7 Asts: Campazzo 9 PIR: Campazzo 25	Boxscore	Pts: Howard 35; Rebs: Sedekerskis 14; Asts: Miller-McIntyre 12; PIR: Howard 27	Arena: WiZink Center; Attendance: 9,484; Referees: Mehdi Difallah, Tomislav Hordov, Saulius Račys

5 April 2024	Bayern Munich (German Basketball Federation)	75–82	(Hellenic Basketball Federation) Panathinaikos AKTOR	Munich
20:30 (CEST)	Scoring by quarter: 18–13, 18–27, 18–18, 21–24
	Pts: Weiler-Babb 15; Rebs: Ibaka 7 Asts: Bolmaro 7 PIR: Ibaka, Weiler-Babb 17	Boxscore	Pts: Nunn 17; Rebs: Sloukas 6 Asts: Sloukas 7 PIR: Sloukas 21	Arena: BMW Park; Attendance: 6,388; Referees: Fernando Rocha, Oļegs Latiševs, Alberto Baena

5 April 2024	EA7 Emporio Armani Milan (Italian Basketball Federation)	90–75	(Italian Basketball Federation) Virtus Segafredo Bologna	Assago
20:30 (CEST)	Scoring by quarter: 22–18, 24–16, 27–19, 17–22
	Pts: Mirotić 18; Rebs: Mirotić 11; Asts: Shields 5 PIR: Mirotić 27	Boxscore	Pts: Shengelia 21; Rebs: Polonara 6 Asts: Polonara, Belinelli 3 PIR: Polonara 21	Arena: Forum; Attendance: 12,486; Referees: Matej Boltauzer, Robert Lottermoser, Luka Kardum

=== Round 34 ===
11 April 2024	Žalgiris (Lithuanian Basketball Federation)	62–64	(Spanish Basketball Federation) Real Madrid	Kaunas
19:00 (CEST)	Scoring by quarter: 9–16, 16–15, 17–13, 20–20
	Pts: Evans, Manek 14; Rebs: Manek 7 Asts: Ulanovas 6 PIR: Evans 16	Boxscore	Pts: Musa 17; Rebs: Musa, Poirier 7 Asts: Llull 4 PIR: Musa 19	Arena: Žalgirio Arena; Attendance: 15,077; Referees: Robert Lottermoser, Uroš Nikolić, Joseph Bissang

11 April 2024	AS Monaco (French Federation of Basketball)	89–85	(German Basketball Federation) Bayern Munich	Fontvieille
19:00 (CEST)	Scoring by quarter: 29–14, 23–16, 20–30, 17–25
	Pts: Diallo 20; Rebs: Diallo 5 Asts: James 12; PIR: James 25	Boxscore	Pts: Edwards 26; Rebs: Booker 5 Asts: Lučić, Francisco 4 PIR: Edwards 25	Arena: Salle Gaston Médecin; Attendance: 3,655; Referees: Carmelo Paternicò, Emilio Pérez, Luka Kardum

11 April 2024	Anadolu Efes (Turkish Basketball Federation)	100–55	(Basketball Federation of Serbia) Crvena zvezda Meridianbet	Istanbul
19:30 (CEST)	Scoring by quarter: 15–11, 30–20, 31–13, 24–11
	Pts: Bryant 26; Rebs: Osmani 7 Asts: Larkin 7 PIR: Oturu, Larkin 24	Boxscore	Pts: three players 11; Rebs: Bolomboy 8 Asts: Teodosić 4 PIR: Mitrović 20	Arena: Sinan Erdem Dome; Attendance: 14,859; Referees: Juan Carlos García, Piotr Pastusiak, Hugues Thépénier

11 April 2024	Maccabi Playtika Tel Aviv (Israeli Basketball Association)	92–86	(Italian Basketball Federation) EA7 Emporio Armani Milan	Belgrade
20:05 (CEST)	Scoring by quarter: 27–23, 25–29, 25–18, 15–16
	Pts: Baldwin 18; Rebs: Nebo 9 Asts: Blatt 9 PIR: Nebo 22	Boxscore	Pts: Lô 13; Rebs: Poythress 9 Asts: Napier 7 PIR: Lô, Poythress 16	Arena: Belgrade Arena; Attendance: 0 Referees: Carlos Peruga, Mehdi Difallah, Alberto Baena

11 April 2024	Panathinaikos AKTOR (Hellenic Basketball Federation)	84–75	(German Basketball Federation) ALBA Berlin	Marousi
20:15 (CEST)	Scoring by quarter: 17–23, 21–14, 22–26, 24–12
	Pts: Nunn 28; Rebs: Hernangómez 8 Asts: Sloukas 7 PIR: Sloukas 27	Boxscore	Pts: Koumadje 13; Rebs: Koumadje, Bean 7 Asts: three players 3 PIR: Samar 15	Arena: OAKA Altion; Attendance: 18,450; Referees: Emin Moğulkoç, Sašo Petek, Tomasz Trawicki

12 April 2024	Olympiacos (Hellenic Basketball Federation)	84–81(OT)	(Turkish Basketball Federation) Fenerbahçe Beko	Piraeus
20:15 (CEST)	Scoring by quarter: 19–19, 19–15, 15–18, 16–17, Overtime: 15–12
	Pts: Canaan 27; Rebs: Fall, Papanikolaou 6 Asts: Walkup 6 PIR: Canaan 26	Boxscore	Pts: Hayes-Davis 21; Rebs: Calathes 8 Asts: Calathes 7 PIR: Hayes-Davis 17	Arena: Peace and Friendship Stadium; Attendance: 12,239; Referees: Matej Boltauzer, Tomislav Hordov, Oļegs Latiševs

12 April 2024	Partizan Mozzart Bet (Basketball Federation of Serbia)	79–66	(Spanish Basketball Federation) Valencia Basket	Belgrade
20:30 (CEST)	Scoring by quarter: 15–21, 20–16, 23–15, 21–14
	Pts: Nunnally 19; Rebs: LeDay 7 Asts: Punter 5 PIR: Nunnally 27	Boxscore	Pts: Ojeleye 17; Rebs: Davies 6 Asts: Harper, Jones 4 PIR: Ojeleye 22	Arena: Belgrade Arena; Attendance: 19,137; Referees: Fernando Rocha, Milan Nedović, Gytis Vilius

12 April 2024	Virtus Segafredo Bologna (Italian Basketball Federation)	91–95	(Spanish Basketball Federation) Baskonia	Bologna
20:30 (CEST)	Scoring by quarter: 22–21, 31–23, 21–31, 17–20
	Pts: Lundberg 18; Rebs: Hackett 6 Asts: Hackett 8 PIR: Lundberg 22	Boxscore	Pts: Howard 34; Rebs: Costello 9 Asts: Miller-McIntyre 7 PIR: Howard 27	Arena: Segafredo Arena; Attendance: 9,222; Referees: Ilija Belošević, Saša Pukl, Amit Balak

12 April 2024	LDLC ASVEL (French Federation of Basketball)	76–72	(Spanish Basketball Federation) Barcelona	Décines-Charpieu
21:00 (CEST)	Scoring by quarter: 24–18, 14–24, 19–15, 19–15
	Pts: Lauvergne 20; Rebs: Fall 8 Asts: Lee 8 PIR: Fall, Lee 20	Boxscore	Pts: Jokubaitis 12; Rebs: Nnaji 9 Asts: Rubio 6 PIR: Nnaji 17	Arena: LDLC Arena; Attendance: 11,329; Referees: Sreten Radović, Anne Panther, Gentian Cici

== Average home attendances ==
As of 12 April 2024

Pos	Team	Total	High	Low	Average	Change
1	(Basketball Federation of Serbia) Partizan Mozzart Bet	338,574	20,200	18,912	19,916	+12.0%
2	(Basketball Federation of Serbia) Crvena zvezda Meridianbet	303,316	20,875	12,537	17,842	+152.1%
3	(Lithuanian Basketball Federation) Žalgiris	251,136	15,222	12,881	14,773	−0.2%
4	(Hellenic Basketball Federation) Panathinaikos AKTOR	251,042	18,450	6,451	14,767	+145.7%
5	(Turkish Basketball Federation) Anadolu Efes	209,506	15,124	7,813	12,324	−5.9%
6	(Hellenic Basketball Federation) Olympiacos	194,679	12,239	8,127	11,452	+19.2%
7	(Italian Basketball Federation) EA7 Emporio Armani Milan	170,870	12,486	7,814	10,051	+6.4%
8	(Turkish Basketball Federation) Fenerbahçe Beko	165,889	12,417	2,938	9,758	−4.8%
9	(Spanish Basketball Federation) Baskonia	165,840	14,017	7,542	9,755	+9.4%
10	(German Basketball Federation) ALBA Berlin	159,895	13,247	5,566	9,406	+6.0%
11	(Spanish Basketball Federation) Real Madrid	149,043	11,432	5,984	8,767	+14.8%
12	(Italian Basketball Federation) Virtus Segafredo Bologna	136,559	9,630	4,437	8,033	+30.9%
13	(French Federation of Basketball) LDLC ASVEL	128,605	11,354	4,370	7,565	+39.3%
14	(Spanish Basketball Federation) Valencia Basket	108,281	7,997	2,809	6,369	+5.1%
15	(Spanish Basketball Federation) Barcelona	106,113	7,611	4,588	6,242	−0.8%
16	(German Basketball Federation) Bayern Munich	105,712	6,410	5,597	6,218	+4.5%
17	(French Federation of Basketball) AS Monaco	66,783	5,000	2,164	3,928	−8.6%
18	(Israeli Basketball Association) Maccabi Playtika Tel Aviv	10,759	10,559	0	633	−93.8%
	League total	3,022,600	20,875	0	9,878	+13.5%

Source: EuroLeague

1. Anadolu Efes' home game against Maccabi Playtika Tel Aviv was relocated to Arena Riga in Riga, Latvia due to security concerns derived from the Gaza war. It had an attendance of 7,813.
2. Fenerbahçe Beko's home game against Maccabi Playtika Tel Aviv was relocated to Kalnapilio Arena in Panevėžys, Lithuania due to security concerns derived from the Gaza war. It had an attendance of 2,938.
3. Maccabi Playtika Tel Aviv played all except one of their home games in Serbia's capital, Belgrade, due to security concerns derived from the Gaza war. All Maccabi Playtika Tel Aviv home games in Belgrade, except one, were played behind closed doors.
