= 2023–24 in Spanish basketball =

Basketball in Spain
- Season: 2023–24

Men's basketball
- Liga ACB: Real Madrid
- LEB Oro: Leyma Coruña
- LEB Plata: ODILO FC Cartagena CB
- Copa del Rey: Real Madrid
- Copa Princesa de Asturias: Movistar Estudiantes
- Supercopa de España: Real Madrid

The 2023–24 season was the 88th season of competitive basketball in Spain.

== Promotion and relegation ==
=== Pre-season ===
League	Promoted to league	Relegated from league
Liga ACB	MoraBanc Andorra; Zunder Palencia	Carplus Fuenlabrada; Real Betis Baloncesto
LEB Oro	Grupo Ureta Tizona Burgos; ~~CB Prat~~ (Note: Refused to promote and Rioverde Clavijo was registered in its place.); Hestia Menorca	~~Melilla Ciudad del Deporte~~ (Note: Swapped places with CB Almansa con Afanion.); Juaristi ISB; Bueno Arenas Albacete Basket
LEB Plata	Palmer Basket Mallorca Palma; Ibersol CB Tarragona; Homs UE Mataró; Pajarraco CB Santfeliuenc; Huelva Comercio LRi21 VIRIDIS; Ciudad de Huelva Gestia (Note: Purchased place of ENERparking Basket Navarra.); Juventud Alcalá Escribano EME (Note: Swapped places with Italtel Alcobendas.)	Real Canoe NC; Baloncesto Talavera; ~~OCA Global CB Salou~~ (Note: Swapped places with CB Cornellà.); La Antigua CB Tormes; Baskonia B; Recambios Gaudí CB Mollet

== National team ==
=== Spain men's national basketball team ===
==== Friendlies ====
25 June 2024	Spain	84–87(OT)	Italy	Madrid, Spain
19:00	Scoring by quarter: 10–14, 23–14, 21–22, 19–23, Overtime: 11–14
	Pts: W. Hernangómez 23; Rebs: Garuba 6 Asts: Núñez 7 Eff: W. Hernangómez 23	Report	Pts: Gallinari 16; Rebs: Polonara 7 Asts: Spissu 6 Eff: Gallinari 20	Arena: WiZink Center; Attendance: 8,005; Referees: Fernando Calatrava, Xavier Torres, Alfonso Olivares

28 June 2024	Spain	84–74	Dominican Republic	Alicante, Spain
19:00	Scoring by quarter: 23–24, 20–14, 20–19, 21–17
	Pts: Brown 14; Rebs: Garuba 6 Asts: Brown 6 Eff: Brown 21	Report	Pts: Duarte 27; Rebs: Núñez, Vargas 6 Asts: Feliz, Montero 5 Eff: Duarte 19	Arena: Pedro Ferrándiz; Attendance: 4,500; Referees: Luis Miguel Castillo, Arnau Padrós, Raúl Zamorano

19 July 2024	Spain	76–72	Argentina	Guadalajara, Spain
20:00	Scoring by quarter: 29–18, 22–24, 12–17, 13–13
	Pts: Aldama 14; Rebs: W. Hernangómez 9 Asts: Llull 5 Eff: W. Hernangómez 24	Report	Pts: Fernández 13; Rebs: Brussino 7 Asts: Campazzo 6 Eff: Fernández 17	Arena: Palacio Multiusos; Attendance: 5,500; Referees: Joaquín García, Sergio Rodríguez, Raúl Zamorano

23 July 2024	Spain	107–84	Puerto Rico	Madrid, Spain
20:30	Scoring by quarter: 30–16, 29–21, 30–25, 18–22
	Pts: Aldama 20; Rebs: J. Hernangómez, López-Arostegui 4 Asts: Brown, Garuba 5 Eff: Aldama 22	Report	Pts: Alvarado 19; Rebs: Romero 10; Asts: Conditt IV, Waters 3 Eff: Romero 16	Arena: WiZink Center; Attendance: 8,754; Referees: Joaquín García, Roberto Lucas, Vicente Martínez

==== EuroBasket 2025 qualification ====
===== Group C =====
Pos	Team	Pld	W	L	PF	PA	PD	Pts	Qualification
1	Latvia	6	6	0	475	416	+59	12	EuroBasket 2025 as host
2	Spain	6	3	3	413	415	−2	9 (Note: Tied on head-to-head points. Head-to-head points difference: Spain +2, Belgium –2.)	EuroBasket 2025
3	Belgium	6	3	3	433	395	+38	9	EuroBasket 2025
4	Slovakia	6	0	6	386	481	−95	6	

Source: FIBA
Rules for classification: 1) Points; 2) Head-to-head; 3) Points difference; 4) Points scored.
Notes:

22 February 2024	Spain	75–79	Latvia	Zaragoza, Spain
20:00	Scoring by quarter: 14–23, 23–17, 20–17, 18–22
	Pts: Brizuela 16; Rebs: J. Hernangómez 7 Asts: Rubio 5 Eff: Pradilla 15	Boxscore	Pts: Lomažs 18; Rebs: Čavars, Kurucs 6 Asts: Lomažs 7 Eff: Lomažs 20	Arena: Pabellón Príncipe Felipe; Attendance: 10,734; Referees: Ademir Zurapović (BIH), Igor Mitrovski (MKD), Beniamino Attard (ITA)

25 February 2024	Belgium	58–53	Spain	Charleroi, Belgium
17:30	Scoring by quarter: 11–14, 8–12, 21–13, 18–14
	Pts: Obasohan 19; Rebs: Gillet 8 Asts: Schwartz 4 Eff: Gillet 22	Boxscore	Pts: Brizuela 14; Rebs: López-Arostegui 7 Asts: Brizuela, Rubio 3 Eff: Brizuela, Sima 10	Arena: Dôme; Attendance: 6,500; Referees: Boris Krejić (SLO), Nicolás Maestre (FRA), Carsten Straube (GER)

==== 2024 FIBA Men's Olympic Qualifying Tournaments ====
===== Group A =====
Pos	Team	Pld	W	L	PF	PA	PD	Pts	Qualification
1	Spain (H)	2	2	0	193	140	+53	4	Semi-finals
2	Lebanon	2	1	1	133	174	−41	3	Semi-finals
3	Angola	2	0	2	151	163	−12	2	

Source: FIBA
(H) Hosts

2 July 2024	Lebanon	59–104	Spain	Valencia, Spain
20:30	Scoring by quarter: 18–24, 13–27, 13–27, 15–26
	Pts: Khayat 20; Rebs: Khayat 6 Asts: Spellman 4 Eff: Khayat 19	Boxscore	Pts: Aldama 17; Rebs: Aldama 9 Asts: Brown 9 Eff: Garuba 26	Arena: La Fonteta; Attendance: 4,153; Referees: Mārtiņš Kozlovskis (LAT), Johnny Batista (PUR), Blanca Burns (USA)

3 July 2024	Spain	89–81	Angola	Valencia, Spain
20:30	Scoring by quarter: 22–17, 24–26, 22–16, 21–22
	Pts: Aldama 24; Rebs: W. Hernangómez 10; Asts: Brown 11; Eff: Aldama 30	Boxscore	Pts: Bango 15; Rebs: Fernando 12; Asts: Gonçalves 5 Eff: Fernando 22	Arena: La Fonteta; Attendance: 4,581; Referees: Jorge Vázquez (PUR), Johnny Batista (PUR), Yevgeniy Mikheyev (KAZ)

===== Knockout =====
6 July 2024 SF	Finland	74–81	Spain	Valencia, Spain
20:30	Scoring by quarter: 20–17, 10–21, 29–18, 15–25
	Pts: Gustavson 15; Rebs: Jantunen 9 Asts: Little 4 Eff: Jantunen 21	Boxscore	Pts: W. Hernangómez 28; Rebs: Aldama 8 Asts: Brown 7 Eff: W. Hernangómez 29	Arena: La Fonteta; Attendance: 5,132; Referees: Mārtiņš Kozlovskis (LAT), Johnny Batista (PUR), Blanca Burns (USA)

7 July 2024 Final	Spain	86–78	Bahamas	Valencia, Spain
20:30	Scoring by quarter: 17–17, 25–17, 23–22, 21–22
	Pts: Brown 18; Rebs: Aldama, W. Hernangómez 7 Asts: Díaz 4 Eff: three players 19	Boxscore	Pts: Hield 19; Rebs: Ayton 14; Asts: Edgecombe 5 Eff: Ayton 26	Arena: La Fonteta; Attendance: 7,035; Referees: Mārtiņš Kozlovskis (LAT), Johnny Batista (PUR), Boris Krejić (SLO)

==== 2024 Summer Olympics ====
===== Group A =====
Pos	Team	Pld	W	L	PF	PA	PD	Pts	Qualification
1	Canada	3	3	0	267	247	+20	6	Quarterfinals
2	Australia	3	1	2	246	250	−4	4 (Note: Australia 3 Pts, +6 PD; Greece 3 Pts, −1 PD; Spain 3 Pts, −5 PD.)	Quarterfinals
3	Greece	3	1	2	233	241	−8	4	Quarterfinals
4	Spain	3	1	2	249	257	−8	4	

Source: FIBA
Rules for classification: 1) classification points; 2) head-to-head results; 3) head-to-head game points difference; 4) head-to-head number of game points scored.
Notes:

27 July 2024	Australia	92–80	Spain	Lille, France
11:00	Scoring by quarter: 31–21, 18–21, 20–18, 23–20
	Pts: Landale 20; Rebs: Landale 9 Asts: Giddey 8 Eff: Landale 28	Boxscore	Pts: Aldama 27; Rebs: Garuba 7 Asts: Brown 7 Eff: Aldama 26	Arena: Pierre Mauroy Stadium; Attendance: 26,991; Referees: Gatis Saliņš (LAT), Omar Bermúdez (MEX), Juan Fernández (ARG)

30 July 2024	Spain	84–77	Greece	Lille, France
11:00	Scoring by quarter: 21–22, 28–13, 13–21, 22–21
	Pts: Aldama 19; Rebs: Aldama 12; Asts: Brown 10; Eff: Aldama 25	Boxscore	Pts: Antetokounmpo 27; Rebs: Antetokounmpo 11; Asts: Calathes 7 Eff: Antetokounmpo 32	Arena: Pierre Mauroy Stadium; Attendance: 26,980; Referees: Ademir Zurapović (BIH), Mārtiņš Kozlovskis (LAT), Julio Anaya (PAN)

2 August 2024	Canada	88–85	Spain	Lille, France
17:15	Scoring by quarter: 19–19, 30–19, 15–18, 24–29
	Pts: Gilgeous-Alexander 20; Rebs: Brooks, Murray 4 Asts: Murray 6 Eff: Nembhard 19	Boxscore	Pts: Brizuela 17; Rebs: Aldama 11; Asts: three players 4 Eff: Aldama 17	Arena: Pierre Mauroy Stadium; Attendance: 26,133; Referees: Ademir Zurapović (BIH), Julio Anaya (PAN), Gatis Saliņš (LAT)

== European competitions ==
=== EuroLeague ===
==== Regular season ====
Pos	Team	Pld	W	L	PF	PA	PD	Qualification
1	(Spanish Basketball Federation) Real Madrid	34	27	7	2924	2681	+243	Qualification to playoffs
2	(Hellenic Basketball Federation) Panathinaikos AKTOR	34	23	11	2752	2580	+172	Qualification to playoffs
3	(French Federation of Basketball) AS Monaco	34	23	11	2770	2671	+99	Qualification to playoffs
4	(Spanish Basketball Federation) Barcelona	34	22	12	2812	2692	+120	Qualification to playoffs
5	(Hellenic Basketball Federation) Olympiacos	34	22	12	2658	2538	+120	Qualification to playoffs
6	(Turkish Basketball Federation) Fenerbahçe Beko	34	20	14	2855	2723	+132	Qualification to playoffs
7	(Israeli Basketball Association) Maccabi Playtika Tel Aviv	34	20	14	2969	2939	+30	Qualification to play-in
8	(Spanish Basketball Federation) Baskonia	34	18	16	2849	2867	−18	Qualification to play-in
9	(Turkish Basketball Federation) Anadolu Efes	34	17	17	2871	2855	+16	Qualification to play-in
10	(Italian Basketball Federation) Virtus Segafredo Bologna	34	17	17	2728	2804	−76	Qualification to play-in
11	(Basketball Federation of Serbia) Partizan Mozzart Bet	34	16	18	2782	2802	−20	
12	(Italian Basketball Federation) EA7 Emporio Armani Milan	34	15	19	2645	2631	+14	
13	(Spanish Basketball Federation) Valencia Basket	34	14	20	2578	2674	−96	
14	(Lithuanian Basketball Federation) Žalgiris	34	14	20	2694	2692	+2	
15	(German Basketball Federation) Bayern Munich	34	13	21	2604	2724	−120	
16	(Basketball Federation of Serbia) Crvena zvezda Meridianbet	34	11	23	2764	2816	−52	
17	(French Federation of Basketball) LDLC ASVEL	34	9	25	2646	2859	−213	
18	(German Basketball Federation) ALBA Berlin	34	5	29	2591	2944	−353	

Source: EuroLeague
Rules for classification: All points scored in extra period(s) were not counted in the standings, nor for any tie-break situation.

==== Play-in ====
Under the new format, the 7th to 10th-ranked teams faced each other in the play-in. Each game is hosted by the team with the higher regular season record. The format was similar to the first two rounds of the Page–McIntyre system for a four-team playoff that was identical to that of the NBA play-in tournament. First, the 7th seed hosted the 8th seed, with the winner advancing to the playoffs; likewise the 9th seed hosted the 10th seed, with the loser eliminated. Then the loser of the 7-v-8 game hosted the winner of the 9-v-10 game, with the winner of that game getting the final playoff spot.

Round 1
Play-In A
7	(Israel) Maccabi Playtika Tel Aviv	113
8	(Spain) Baskonia	85
Play-In B
9	(Turkey) Anadolu Efes	64
10	(Italy) Virtus Segafredo Bologna	67

Round 2
Play-In C
8	(Spain) Baskonia	89
10	(Italy) Virtus Segafredo Bologna	77

==== Playoffs ====
Team 1	Series	Team 2	Game 1	Game 2	Game 3	Game 4	Game 5
Real Madrid (Spain)	3–0	(Spain) Baskonia	90–74	101–90	102–98	—	—
Barcelona (Spain)	2–3	(Greece) Olympiacos	75–77	77–69	82–80	58–92	59–63

==== Final Four ====
Semifinals
24 May
(Spanish Basketball Federation) Real Madrid	87
(Hellenic Basketball Federation) Olympiacos	76
24 May
(Hellenic Basketball Federation) Panathinaikos	73
(Turkish Basketball Federation) Fenerbahçe Beko	57

Championship game
26 May
(Spanish Basketball Federation) Real Madrid	80
(Hellenic Basketball Federation) Panathinaikos	95
Third place game
26 May
(Hellenic Basketball Federation) Olympiacos	87
(Turkish Basketball Federation) Fenerbahçe Beko	84

=== EuroCup Basketball ===
==== Regular season ====
===== Group A =====
Pos	Team	Pld	W	L	PF	PA	PD	Qualification
1	(French Federation of Basketball) Paris Basketball	18	17	1	1754	1401	+353	Advance to quarterfinals
2	(Israeli Basketball Association) Hapoel Shlomo Tel Aviv	18	13	5	1729	1600	+129	Advance to quarterfinals
3	(British Basketball) London Lions	18	12	6	1608	1546	+62	Advance to eighthfinals
4	(Basketball Federation of Ukraine) Prometey	18	10	8	1598	1574	+24	Advance to eighthfinals
5	(Spanish Basketball Federation) Joventut Badalona	18	10	8	1517	1503	+14	Advance to eighthfinals
6	(Turkish Basketball Federation) Beşiktaş Emlakjet	18	9	9	1400	1428	−28	Advance to eighthfinals
7	(Lithuanian Basketball Federation) Wolves	18	8	10	1462	1550	−88	
8	(Italian Basketball Federation) Umana Reyer Venezia	18	8	10	1507	1538	−31	
9	(German Basketball Federation) Veolia Towers Hamburg	18	2	16	1478	1762	−284	
10	(Basketball Federation of Slovenia) Cedevita Olimpija	18	1	17	1509	1660	−151	

Source: EuroCup
Rules for classification: All points scored in extra period(s) were not counted in the standings, nor for any tie-break situation.

===== Group B =====
Pos	Team	Pld	W	L	PF	PA	PD	Qualification
1	(French Federation of Basketball) Mincidelice JL Bourg	18	14	4	1486	1368	+118	Advance to quarterfinals
2	(Romanian Basketball Federation) U-BT Cluj-Napoca	18	13	5	1519	1461	+58	Advance to quarterfinals
3	(Spanish Basketball Federation) Dreamland Gran Canaria	18	12	6	1567	1408	+159	Advance to eighthfinals
4	(German Basketball Federation) ratiopharm Ulm	18	10	8	1502	1522	−20	Advance to eighthfinals
5	(Hellenic Basketball Federation) Aris Midea	18	9	9	1335	1334	+1	Advance to eighthfinals
6	(Turkish Basketball Federation) Türk Telekom	18	8	10	1433	1421	+12	Advance to eighthfinals
7	(Basketball Federation of Montenegro) Budućnost VOLI	18	8	10	1413	1443	−30	
8	(Italian Basketball Federation) Dolomiti Energia Trento	18	7	11	1409	1485	−76	
9	(Lithuanian Basketball Federation) 7bet-Lietkabelis	18	7	11	1466	1544	−78	
10	(Polish Basketball Federation) Śląsk Wrocław	18	2	16	1371	1515	−144	

Source: EuroCup
Rules for classification: All points scored in extra period(s) were not counted in the standings, nor for any tie-break situation.

==== Playoffs ====
===== Eighthfinals =====
Team 1	Score	Team 2
ratiopharm Ulm (German Basketball Federation)	79–88	(Spanish Basketball Federation) Joventut
Dreamland Gran Canaria (Spanish Basketball Federation)	78–80	(Turkish Basketball Federation) Beşiktaş Emlakjet

===== Quarterfinals =====
Team 1	Score	Team 2
Paris Basketball (French Federation of Basketball)	86–70	(Spanish Basketball Federation) Joventut

=== Basketball Champions League ===
==== Regular season ====
===== Group A =====
Pos	Team	Pld	W	L	PF	PA	PD	Pts	Qualification
1	(Spain) Unicaja	6	4	2	490	442	+48	10	Advance to round of 16
2	(France) Le Mans Sarthe	6	3	3	477	463	+14	9	Advance to play-ins
3	(Greece) Peristeri bwin	6	3	3	463	493	−30	9	Advance to play-ins
4	(Hungary) Falco Szombathely	6	2	4	456	488	−32	8	

Source: Groups standings

===== Group C =====
Pos	Team	Pld	W	L	PF	PA	PD	Pts	Qualification
1	(Spain) Lenovo Tenerife	6	4	2	490	443	+47	10	Advance to round of 16
2	(France) Cholet	6	3	3	485	495	−10	9	Advance to play-ins
3	(Turkey) Darüşşafaka Lassa	6	3	3	488	500	−12	9	Advance to play-ins
4	(Latvia) VEF Rīga	6	2	4	431	456	−25	8	

Source: Groups standings

===== Group F =====
Pos	Team	Pld	W	L	PF	PA	PD	Pts	Qualification
1	(Germany) Telekom Baskets Bonn	6	3	3	497	473	+24	9	Advance to round of 16
2	(Israel) Hapoel Holon	6	3	3	463	456	+7	9	Advance to play-ins
3	(Spain) Rio Breogan	6	3	3	462	459	+3	9	Advance to play-ins
4	(Turkey) Bursaspor İnfo Yatırım	6	3	3	439	473	−34	9	

Source: Groups standings

===== Group H =====
Pos	Team	Pld	W	L	PF	PA	PD	Pts	Qualification
1	(Spain) UCAM Murcia	6	5	1	517	427	+90	11	Advance to round of 16
2	(Italy) Bertram Derthona	6	5	1	500	484	+16	11	Advance to play-ins
3	(Turkey) Tofaş	6	2	4	532	551	−19	8	Advance to play-ins
4	(Bosnia and Herzegovina) Igokea	6	0	6	435	522	−87	6	

Source: Groups standings

==== Play-ins ====
Team 1	Series	Team 2	Game 1	Game 2	Game 3
Pınar Karşıyaka (Turkey)	2–1	(Spain) Río Breogán	89–85	73–80	86–76

==== Round of 16 ====
===== Group I =====
Pos	Team	Pld	W	L	PF	PA	PD	Pts	Qualification
1	(Spain) Unicaja	6	6	0	510	422	+88	12	Advance to quarter-finals
2	(Turkey) Tofaş	6	2	4	462	466	−4	8	Advance to quarter-finals
3	(France) SIG Strasbourg	6	2	4	470	510	−40	8	
4	(France) Cholet	6	2	4	474	518	−44	8	

Source: Round of 16 Standings

===== Group K =====
Pos	Team	Pld	W	L	PF	PA	PD	Pts	Qualification
1	(Spain) Lenovo Tenerife	6	4	2	521	511	+10	10	Advance to quarter-finals
2	(Greece) Peristeri	6	3	3	473	475	−2	9	Advance to quarter-finals
3	(Israel) Hapoel Jerusalem	6	3	3	485	479	+6	9	
4	(Turkey) Pınar Karşıyaka	6	2	4	514	528	−14	8	

Source: Round of 16 Standings

===== Group L =====
Pos	Team	Pld	W	L	PF	PA	PD	Pts	Qualification
1	(Spain) UCAM Murcia	6	4	2	490	453	+37	10	Advance to quarter-finals
2	(Greece) Promitheas	6	4	2	485	472	+13	10	Advance to quarter-finals
3	(Israel) Hapoel Holon	6	4	2	474	480	−6	10	
4	(Greece) AEK	6	0	6	490	534	−44	6	

Source: Round of 16 Standings

==== Playoffs ====
Team 1	Series	Team 2	Game 1	Game 2	Game 3
Lenovo Tenerife (Spain)	2–1	(Turkey) Tofaş	83–77	81–90	78–55
UCAM Murcia (Spain)	2–0	(Germany) MHP Riesen Ludwigsburg	98–72	85–72	—
Unicaja (Spain)	2–0	(Greece) Promitheas	67–54	90–83	—

==== Final Four ====
Semifinals
26 April
(Spain) Lenovo Tenerife	97
(Greece) Peristeri	93
26 April
(Spain) UCAM Murcia	74
(Spain) Unicaja	80

Final
28 April
(Spain) Lenovo Tenerife	75
(Spain) Unicaja	80
Third place game
28 April
(Greece) Peristeri	84
(Spain) UCAM Murcia	87

=== FIBA Europe Cup ===
==== Qualifying tournaments ====
===== Qualifying tournament G =====
Pos	Team	Pld	W	L	PF	PA	PD	Pts	Qualification
1	(Spanish Basketball Federation) Casademont Zaragoza	2	2	0	175	153	+22	4	Advance to regular season
2	(Swedish Basketball Federation) Jämtland (H)	2	1	1	142	157	−15	3	
3	(Czech Basketball Federation) KVIS Pardubice	2	0	2	164	171	−7	2	

Source: FIBA Europe Cup
(H) Hosts

==== Regular season ====
===== Group B =====
Pos	Team	Pld	W	L	PF	PA	PD	Pts	Qualification
1	(Spanish Basketball Federation) Surne Bilbao Basket	6	6	0	505	399	+106	12	Advance to second round
2	(Polish Basketball Federation) Anwil Włocłavek	6	3	3	469	409	+60	9	
3	(British Basketball) Caledonia Gladiators	6	3	3	431	475	−44	9	
4	(Romanian Basketball Federation) ABC Sibiu	6	0	6	379	501	−122	6	

Source: FIBA Europe Cup

===== Group F =====
Pos	Team	Pld	W	L	PF	PA	PD	Pts	Qualification
1	(Spanish Basketball Federation) Casademont Zaragoza	4	3	1	331	309	+22	7	Advance to second round
2	(Estonian Basketball Association) Kalev/Cramo	4	2	2	295	301	−6	6	
3	(Italian Basketball Federation) Happy Casa Brindisi	4	1	3	311	327	−16	5	
4	(Israeli Basketball Association) Ironi Ness Ziona	0	0	0	0	0	0	0	Withdrawal

Source: FIBA Europe Cup

==== Second round ====
===== Group K =====
Pos	Team	Pld	W	L	PF	PA	PD	Pts	Qualification
1	(Spanish Basketball Federation) Surne Bilbao Basket	6	5	1	504	438	+66	11	Advance to quarter-finals
2	(Portuguese Basketball Federation) FC Porto	6	4	2	507	453	+54	10	Advance to quarter-finals
3	(German Basketball Federation) Göttingen	6	3	3	477	469	+8	9	
4	(Bulgarian Basketball Federation) Balkan	6	0	6	413	541	−128	6	

Source: FIBA Europe Cup

===== Group M =====
Pos	Team	Pld	W	L	PF	PA	PD	Pts	Qualification
1	(Czech Basketball Federation) ERA Nymburk	6	4	2	445	394	+51	10	Advance to quarter-finals
2	(Spanish Basketball Federation) Casademont Zaragoza	6	4	2	472	445	+27	10	Advance to quarter-finals
3	(French Federation of Basketball) Gravelines Dunkerque	6	3	3	442	460	−18	9	
4	(Turkish Basketball Federation) Manisa BB	6	1	5	400	460	−60	7	

Source: FIBA Europe Cup

==== Play-offs ====
===== Quarter-finals =====
Team 1	Agg.	Team 2	1st leg	2nd leg
Surne Bilbao Basket (Spain)	145–136	(Poland) Legia Warsaw	64–83	81–53
Niners Chemnitz (Germany)	200–150	(Spain) Casademont Zaragoza	98–64	102–86

===== Semi-finals =====
Team 1	Agg.	Team 2	1st leg	2nd leg
Niners Chemnitz (Germany)	171–155	(Spain) Surne Bilbao Basket	98–73	73–82

== Men's basketball ==
=== Liga ACB ===
==== Regular season ====
Pos	Team	Pld	W	L	PF	PA	PD	Qualification or relegation
1	Unicaja	34	28	6	3016	2627	+389	Qualification to playoffs
2	Real Madrid	34	28	6	3001	2707	+294	Qualification to playoffs
3	Barça	34	23	11	2985	2769	+216	Qualification to playoffs
4	Valencia Basket	34	21	13	2856	2788	+68	Qualification to playoffs
5	UCAM Murcia	34	21	13	2829	2735	+94	Qualification to playoffs
6	Lenovo Tenerife	34	21	13	2845	2760	+85	Qualification to playoffs
7	Dreamland Gran Canaria	34	20	14	2859	2771	+88	Qualification to playoffs
8	Baxi Manresa	34	19	15	2878	2875	+3	Qualification to playoffs
9	Baskonia	34	18	16	3008	3004	+4	
10	Joventut Badalona	34	16	18	2776	2939	−163	
11	MoraBanc Andorra	34	13	21	2884	2894	−10	
12	Casademont Zaragoza	34	13	21	2799	2893	−94	
13	Surne Bilbao Basket	34	13	21	2677	2777	−100	
14	Bàsquet Girona	34	13	21	2754	2914	−160	
15	Coviran Granada	34	11	23	2752	2930	−178	
16	Río Breogán	34	11	23	2530	2674	−144	
17	Monbus Obradoiro	34	11	23	2760	2868	−108	Relegation to Primera FEB
18	Zunder Palencia	34	6	28	2682	2966	−284	Relegation to Primera FEB

Source: ACB
Rules for classification: 1) Win–loss record; 2) Head–to–head record; 3) Head–to–head point difference; 4) Point difference; 5) Points scored; 6) Sum of quotients of points scored (Note: Head–to–head record is used only after all the matches between the teams in question have been played)

==== Playoffs ====
Quarterfinals
2	Real Madrid	105	73	2
7	Dreamland Gran Canaria	70	71	0
3	Barça	96	97	2
6	Lenovo Tenerife	86	92	0
1	Unicaja	87	86	2
8	Baxi Manresa	79	63	0
4	Valencia Basket	86	83	77	1
5	UCAM Murcia	96	72	84	2

Semifinals
2	Real Madrid	97	104	95	3
3	Barça	78	98	92	0
1	Unicaja	79	83	74	88	70	2
5	UCAM Murcia	88	101	66	79	79	3

Finals
2	Real Madrid	84	79	84	3
5	UCAM Murcia	76	63	73	0

Source: ACB

=== LEB Oro ===
==== Regular season ====
Pos	Team	Pld	W	L	PF	PA	PD	Pts	Promotion, qualification or relegation
1	Leyma Coruña	34	27	7	3042	2763	+279	61	Promotion to Liga ACB
2	Longevida San Pablo Burgos	34	26	8	2964	2601	+363	60	Qualification to playoffs
3	ICG Força Lleida	34	26	8	2794	2546	+248	60	Qualification to playoffs
4	Movistar Estudiantes	34	25	9	2856	2588	+268	59	Qualification to playoffs
5	Grupo Ureta Tizona Burgos	34	25	9	3049	2725	+324	59	Qualification to playoffs
6	Guuk Gipuzkoa Basket	34	23	11	2819	2634	+185	57	Qualification to playoffs
7	HLA Alicante	34	19	15	2699	2608	+91	53	Qualification to playoffs
8	UEMC Real Valladolid Baloncesto	34	18	16	2636	2715	−79	52	Qualification to playoffs
9	Real Betis Baloncesto	34	17	17	2755	2669	+86	51	Qualification to playoffs
10	Baloncesto Fuenlabrada	34	16	18	2644	2660	−16	50	
11	Club Ourense Baloncesto	34	14	20	2504	2690	−186	48	
12	Hestia Menorca	34	14	20	2474	2617	−143	48	
13	Alimerka Oviedo Baloncesto	34	13	21	2676	2731	−55	47	
14	Grupo Alega Cantabria	34	11	23	2644	2825	−181	45	
15	Amics Castelló	34	11	23	2692	2947	−255	45	
16	Melilla Ciudad del Deporte	34	10	24	2577	2788	−211	44	Relegation to Segunda FEB
17	Cáceres Patrimonio de la Humanidad	34	6	28	2515	2885	−370	40	Relegation to Segunda FEB
18	Rioverde Clavijo	34	5	29	2384	2732	−348	39	Relegation to Segunda FEB

Source: FEB

==== Playoffs ====
Quarter-finals
C	Movistar Estudiantes	86	98	84	65	65	3
9	Real Betis Baloncesto	77	73	90	77	54	2
5	Grupo Ureta Tizona Burgos	108	90	87	79	76	3
6	Guuk Gipuzkoa Basket	90	92	77	82	73	2
2	Longevida San Pablo Burgos	81	91	91	3
8	UEMC Real Valladolid Baloncesto	59	61	75	0
3	ICG Força Lleida	84	88	73	3
7	HLA Alicante	73	68	58	0

Semi-finals
Movistar Estudiantes	86
Grupo Ureta Tizona Burgos	62
Longevida San Pablo Burgos	77
ICG Força Lleida	80

Final
Movistar Estudiantes	70
ICG Força Lleida	85

Source: FEB

=== Cup competitions ===
==== Copa del Rey ====
Quarterfinals; 15–16 February
Real Madrid	84
UCAM Murcia	79
Dreamland Gran Canaria	81
Valencia Basket	89
Barça	102
Baxi Manresa	91
Unicaja	83
Lenovo Tenerife	91

Semifinals; 17 February
Real Madrid	95
Valencia Basket	76
Barça	108
Lenovo Tenerife	76

Final; 18 February
Real Madrid	96
Barça	85

==== Copa Princesa de Asturias ====
28 January 2024	Movistar Estudiantes	80–72	Leyma Coruña	Madrid
12:30	Scoring by quarter: 21–21, 21–17, 11–16, 27–18
	Pts: Wintering 16; Rebs: Larsen 7 Asts: Wintering 6 Eff: Wintering 22	Report	Pts: Huskić 20; Rebs: Huskić, McDonnell 6 Asts: Huskić 3 Eff: Huskić 24	Arena: WiZink Center; Attendance: 8,321; Referees: Germán Morales, Sandra Sánchez, Leandro Lezcano

==== Supercopa de España ====
Semifinals
UCAM Murcia	74
Unicaja	79
Barça	80
Real Madrid	90

Final
Unicaja	81
Real Madrid	88
