= 2023–24 ACB season =

Spanish professional basketball season

Liga Endesa^{1}
- Season: 2023–24
- Games played: 326
- Teams: 18

Regular season
- Top seed: Unicaja
- Season MVP: (Argentina) Facundo Campazzo
- Relegated: Monbus Obradoiro; Zunder Palencia

Finals
- Champions: Real Madrid; 15th ACB title 37th Spanish title
- Runners-up: UCAM Murcia
- Semi-finalists: Unicaja; Barça
- Finals MVP: (Bosnia and Herzegovina) Džanan Musa

Statistical leaders
Points	(United States) Markus Howard	19.4
Rebounds	(Cape Verde) Edy Tavares	7.3
Assists	(Brazil) Marcelo Huertas	6.4
Index Rating	(Nigeria) Chima Moneke	20.4

Records
- Biggest home win: Barça 109–68 Zaragoza (3 March 2024)
- Biggest away win: Granada 61–94 Barça (21 January 2024)
- Highest scoring: Valencia 111–101 Baskonia (7 April 2024)
- Winning streak: 14 games Unicaja
- Losing streak: 10 games Obradoiro
- Highest attendance: 15,504; Baskonia 92–72 Bilbao (30 September 2023)
- Lowest attendance: 2,456; Andorra 87–74 Palencia (1 October 2023)
- ^{1} Sponsored league name, referring to Endesa.

The 2023–24 ACB season, also known as Liga Endesa for sponsorship reasons, was the 41st season of the top Spanish professional basketball league, since its establishment in 1983. It started on 23 September 2023 with the regular season and ended on 12 June 2024 with the finals.

Barça was the defending champion which was swept in semifinals by Real Madrid in a rematch of last year's finals, with Los Blancos winning a record-extending 37th Spanish title (15th in the ACB era) after another sweep against outstanding UCAM Murcia in the finals.

== Teams ==
=== Promotion and relegation (pre-season) ===
A total of 18 teams contested the league, including 16 sides from the 2022–23 season and two promoted from the 2022–23 LEB Oro. This includes the top team from the LEB Oro, and the winners of the LEB Oro Final Four.

On May 13, 2023, MoraBanc Andorra became the first team to secure the promotion to ACB after a 95–61 huge win to Club Ourense Baloncesto in the next-to-last round of the regular season that crowned it as LEB Oro champions. It returned to the league after a one-year absence. On June 18, 2023, Zunder Palencia became the second team to achieve the promotion to ACB after winning the LEB Oro Final Four in a 95–83 win against Hereda San Pablo Burgos to get the last spot to ACB. It was the debut season of the Castilian team in the Spanish top tier and it became the first team from the province of Palencia to compete in the Spanish top flight.

The first team to be relegated from ACB was Carplus Fuenlabrada, after a 93–112 huge loss against Cazoo Baskonia on 23 April 2023, ending their 18-year stay in the top tier. The second team relegated to LEB Oro was Real Betis Baloncesto, after a 79–77 close lose in the last round against Real Madrid on 24 May 2023, ending their five-year stay in the top tier.

▲ Promoted from LEB Oro	▼ Relegated to LEB Oro
MoraBanc Andorra; Zunder Palencia	Real Betis Baloncesto; Carplus Fuenlabrada

=== Venues and locations ===
Location of teams in 2023–24 ACB

Team	Home city	Arena	Capacity
Barça	Barcelona	Palau Blaugrana	7,586
Baskonia	Vitoria-Gasteiz	Buesa Arena	15,504
Bàsquet Girona	Girona	Fontajau	5,500
Baxi Manresa	Manresa	Nou Congost	5,000
Casademont Zaragoza	Zaragoza	Pabellón Príncipe Felipe	10,744
Coviran Granada	Granada	Palacio de Deportes	8,100
Dreamland Gran Canaria	Las Palmas	Gran Canaria Arena	9,870
Joventut Badalona	Badalona	Palau Municipal d'Esports	12,760
Lenovo Tenerife	San Cristóbal de La Laguna	Santiago Martín	5,100
Monbus Obradoiro	Santiago de Compostela	Multiusos Fontes do Sar	6,000
MoraBanc Andorra	Andorra la Vella	Pavelló de Govern	5,001
Real Madrid	Madrid	WiZink Center	13,109
Río Breogán	Lugo	Pazo dos Deportes	5,310
Surne Bilbao Basket	Bilbao	Bilbao Arena	10,014
UCAM Murcia	Murcia	Palacio de Deportes	7,454
Unicaja	Málaga	Martín Carpena	10,699
Valencia Basket	Valencia	La Fonteta	8,500
Zunder Palencia	Palencia	Municipal de Deportes	5,012

=== Personnel and kits ===
Team	Head coach	Captain	Kit manufacturer	Shirt sponsor (chest)
Barça	(Spanish Basketball Federation) Roger Grimau	(Spain) Álex Abrines	Nike	Assistència Sanitària
Baskonia	(Basketball Federation of Montenegro) Duško Ivanović	(Lithuania) Tadas Sedekerskis	Puma	
Bàsquet Girona	(Hellenic Basketball Federation) Fotios Katsikaris	(Spain) Quino Colom	Nike	FIATC
Baxi Manresa	(Spanish Basketball Federation) Pedro Martínez	(Spain) Guillem Jou	Pentex	Baxi Climatización
Casademont Zaragoza	(Spanish Basketball Federation) Porfirio Fisac	(Spain) Santiago Yusta	Mercury	Casademont
Coviran Granada	(Spanish Basketball Federation) Pablo Pin	(Spain) David Iriarte	Vive	Coviran
Dreamland Gran Canaria	(Basketball Federation of Slovenia) Jaka Lakovič	(France) Andrew Albicy	Spalding	Dreamland, Gran Canaria
Joventut Badalona	(Spanish Basketball Federation) Dani Miret	(Spain) Pau Ribas	Spalding	Fundación Probitas
Lenovo Tenerife	(Spanish Basketball Federation) Txus Vidorreta	(Brazil) Marcelo Huertas	Austral	Lenovo, Tenerife
Monbus Obradoiro	(Spanish Basketball Federation) Moncho Fernández	(Spain) Álvaro Muñoz	Geff	Estrella Galicia 0,0
MoraBanc Andorra	(Spanish Basketball Federation) Natxo Lezkano	(Spain) Nacho Llovet	Hummel	MoraBanc, Andorra
Real Madrid	(Spanish Basketball Federation) Chus Mateo	(Spain) Sergio Llull	Adidas	Autohero
Río Breogán	(Croatian Basketball Federation) Veljko Mršić	(Spain) Sergi Quintela	Adidas	Estrella Galicia 0,0
Surne Bilbao Basket	(Spanish Basketball Federation) Jaume Ponsarnau	(Spain) Xavi Rabaseda	Hummel	Surne Seguros & Pensiones
UCAM Murcia	(Spanish Basketball Federation) Sito Alonso	(Montenegro) Nemanja Radović	Hummel	UCAM
Unicaja	(Spanish Basketball Federation) Ibon Navarro	(Spain) Alberto Díaz	Joma	Unicaja, Málaga
Valencia Basket	(Spanish Basketball Federation) Xavi Albert	(Spain) Víctor Claver	Luanvi	Cultura del Esfuerzo (Note: Cultura del Esfuerzo (transl. "Culture of Effort") is the motto of the club.)
Zunder Palencia	(Spanish Basketball Federation) Luis Guil	(Spain) Chumi Ortega	Hummel	Zunder

=== Coaching changes ===
Team	Outgoing coach	Manner of departure	Date of vacancy	Position in table	Incoming coach	Date of appointment
Bàsquet Girona	(Spanish Basketball Federation) Aíto García Reneses	End of contract	2 June 2023	Pre-season	(Spanish Basketball Federation) Salva Camps	21 June 2023
Zunder Palencia	(Spanish Basketball Federation) Pedro Rivero	End of contract	21 June 2023	Pre-season	(Spanish Basketball Federation) Marco Justo	3 July 2023
Barça	(Lithuanian Basketball Federation) Šarūnas Jasikevičius	End of contract	26 June 2023	Pre-season	(Spanish Basketball Federation) Roger Grimau	26 June 2023
Baskonia	(Spanish Basketball Federation) Joan Peñarroya	Sacked	30 October 2023	8th (4–3)	(Basketball Federation of Montenegro) Duško Ivanović	30 October 2023
Zunder Palencia	(Spanish Basketball Federation) Marco Justo	Sacked	10 December 2023	18th (1–12)	(Spanish Basketball Federation) Alberto Padilla (interim)	11 December 2023
Zunder Palencia	(Spanish Basketball Federation) Alberto Padilla	End of interim period	13 December 2023	18th (1–13)	(Spanish Basketball Federation) Luis Guil	13 December 2023
Bàsquet Girona	(Spanish Basketball Federation) Salva Camps	Sacked	25 January 2024	14th (7–12)	(Hellenic Basketball Federation) Fotios Katsikaris	25 January 2024
Valencia Basket	(Spanish Basketball Federation) Álex Mumbrú	Sacked	5 April 2024	7th (16–11)	(Spanish Basketball Federation) Xavi Albert (interim)	5 Abril 2024
Joventut Badalona	(Spanish Basketball Federation) Carles Duran	Sacked	8 April 2024	10th (14–14)	(Spanish Basketball Federation) Dani Miret	9 Abril 2024

== Regular season ==
=== League table ===
Pos	Team	Pld	W	L	PF	PA	PD	Qualification or relegation
1	Unicaja	34	28	6	3016	2627	+389	Qualification to playoffs
2	Real Madrid	34	28	6	3001	2707	+294	Qualification to playoffs
3	Barça	34	23	11	2985	2769	+216	Qualification to playoffs
4	Valencia Basket	34	21	13	2856	2788	+68	Qualification to playoffs
5	UCAM Murcia	34	21	13	2829	2735	+94	Qualification to playoffs
6	Lenovo Tenerife	34	21	13	2845	2760	+85	Qualification to playoffs
7	Dreamland Gran Canaria	34	20	14	2859	2771	+88	Qualification to playoffs
8	Baxi Manresa	34	19	15	2878	2875	+3	Qualification to playoffs
9	Baskonia	34	18	16	3008	3004	+4	
10	Joventut Badalona	34	16	18	2776	2939	−163	
11	MoraBanc Andorra	34	13	21	2884	2894	−10	
12	Casademont Zaragoza	34	13	21	2799	2893	−94	
13	Surne Bilbao Basket	34	13	21	2677	2777	−100	
14	Bàsquet Girona	34	13	21	2754	2914	−160	
15	Coviran Granada	34	11	23	2752	2930	−178	
16	Río Breogán	34	11	23	2530	2674	−144	
17	Monbus Obradoiro	34	11	23	2760	2868	−108	Relegation to Primera FEB
18	Zunder Palencia	34	6	28	2682	2966	−284	Relegation to Primera FEB

Source: ACB
Rules for classification: 1) Win–loss record; 2) Head–to–head record; 3) Head–to–head point difference; 4) Point difference; 5) Points scored; 6) Sum of quotients of points scored (Note: Head–to–head record is used only after all the matches between the teams in question have been played)

=== Results ===
Home \ Away	BAR	BKN	GIR	BAX	CAZ	COV	DGC	JOV	LNT	MOB	MBA	RMB	BRE	SBB	UCM	UNI	VBC	ZPA
Barça	—	82–62	115–78	82–83	109–68	80–69	95–89	95–79	94–83	92–90	91–87	85–79	85–88	91–82	97–86	91–92	76–79	102–94
Baskonia	103–96	—	92–96	94–86	102–94	104–88	76–88	78–81	104–100	89–79	108–95	85–99	76–74	92–72	94–79	84–93	83–74	94–82
Bàsquet Girona	75–81	85–93	—	83–84	79–89	80–61	88–64	67–82	66–79	78–77	107–104	74–93	87–83	81–68	82–76	78–82	92–88	84–86
Baxi Manresa	77–87	82–90	101–87	—	81–75	90–84	78–71	102–89	73–76	76–56	90–97	88–94	83–68	90–81	83–88	77–88	98–96	92–91
Casademont Zgz	101–99	80–85	81–74	90–80	—	77–84	94–101	113–83	100–106	98–79	72–76	70–79	63–61	77–63	82–76	100–92	75–85	103–96
Coviran Granada	61–94	81–90	91–102	93–94	78–70	—	74–67	86–83	68–80	77–74	91–88	76–83	84–85	87–79	101–104	62–90	81–88	109–85
Dreamland GC	73–83	98–80	78–86	97–92	111–85	89–75	—	97–79	82–94	87–80	97–92	100–77	86–60	83–75	91–80	76–69	79–71	100–73
Joventut	75–93	77–72	96–90	81–83	95–84	86–80	89–75	—	96–88	78–69	84–94	73–101	78–70	81–78	75–82	85–81	80–76	89–77
Lenovo Tenerife	80–83	95–78	74–60	84–80	64–70	89–83	93–92	90–70	—	87–92	71–53	76–82	88–81	101–84	75–73	87–86	86–94	92–71
Monbus Obra	84–89	108–95	85–79	86–94	80–72	77–94	72–81	97–71	86–97	—	101–89	74–85	83–72	77–78	79–87	78–90	75–97	84–64
MoraBanc And	108–92	85–68	93–66	86–90	85–80	88–62	77–98	79–86	66–79	92–89	—	70–89	63–69	87–78	98–73	81–87	99–71	87–74
Real Madrid	86–79	106–100	92–79	72–83	101–70	94–80	97–71	95–92	80–78	79–69	85–76	—	91–58	95–80	106–92	93–99	83–74	91–68
Río Breogán	63–79	79–88	93–75	85–89	82–77	85–79	70–77	85–77	76–54	88–90	97–92	73–80	—	68–80	74–83	65–76	59–61	73–65
Surne Bilbao	68–72	82–80	80–74	74–54	86–83	94–93	81–71	92–71	93–94	72–75	95–73	84–87	68–76	—	77–68	43–67	93–78	80–97
UCAM Murcia	82–73	88–76	81–73	87–74	82–77	91–78	95–69	105–73	80–68	94–81	99–86	73–61	68–61	96–76	—	65–88	77–85	90–77
Unicaja	91–71	95–91	111–80	91–77	83–72	92–70	80–77	113–91	98–75	87–74	92–86	81–87	87–70	101–84	96–71	—	76–82	93–69
Valencia Basket	71–68	111–101	85–89	84–79	76–69	75–81	79–86	83–76	98–73	85–79	86–82	99–93	88–80	79–85	83–82	63–83	—	111–93
Zunder Palencia	83–84	94–101	76–80	88–95	80–88	83–91	82–58	69–75	68–89	75–81	77–70	78–86	74–59	78–72	66–76	72–86	77–101	—

Source: ACB
Legend: Blue = home team win; Red = away team win.

== Playoffs ==
Quarterfinals
2	Real Madrid	105	73	2
7	Dreamland Gran Canaria	70	71	0
3	Barça	96	97	2
6	Lenovo Tenerife	86	92	0
1	Unicaja	87	86	2
8	Baxi Manresa	79	63	0
4	Valencia Basket	86	83	77	1
5	UCAM Murcia	96	72	84	2

Semifinals
2	Real Madrid	97	104	95	3
3	Barça	78	98	92	0
1	Unicaja	79	83	74	88	70	2
5	UCAM Murcia	88	101	66	79	79	3

Finals
2	Real Madrid	84	79	84	3
5	UCAM Murcia	76	63	73	0

Source: ACB

== Final standings ==
Pos	Team	Pld	W	L	Qualification or relegation
1	Real Madrid (C)	42	36	6	Already qualified to EuroLeague
2	UCAM Murcia	45	26	19	Qualification to Champions League regular season
3	Unicaja	41	32	9	Qualification to Champions League regular season
4	Barça	39	25	14	Already qualified to EuroLeague
5	Valencia Basket	37	22	15	Qualification to EuroCup
6	Lenovo Tenerife	36	21	15	Qualification to Champions League regular season
7	Dreamland Gran Canaria	36	20	16	Qualification to EuroCup
8	Baxi Manresa	36	19	17	Qualification to Champions League regular season
9	Baskonia	34	18	16	Already qualified to EuroLeague
10	Joventut Badalona	34	16	18	Qualification to EuroCup
11	MoraBanc Andorra	34	13	21	Qualification to Champions League qualifying rounds
12	Casademont Zaragoza	34	13	21	Qualification to FIBA Europe Cup regular season
13	Surne Bilbao Basket	34	13	21	Qualification to FIBA Europe Cup qualifying rounds
14	Bàsquet Girona	34	13	21	
15	Coviran Granada	34	11	23	
16	Río Breogán	34	11	23	
17	Monbus Obradoiro (R)	34	11	23	Relegation to Primera FEB
18	Zunder Palencia (R)	34	6	28	Relegation to Primera FEB

Source: ACB
(C) Champions; (R) Relegated

== Statistical leaders ==
=== Performance index rating ===
Pos	Player	Club	PIR
1	(Nigeria) Chima Moneke	Baskonia	20.4
2	(Dominican Republic) Jean Montero	MoraBanc Andorra	20.0
3	(Georgia (country)) Giorgi Shermadini	Lenovo Tenerife	17.7
4	(Uganda) Brandon Davies	Valencia Basket	17.5
5	(Ukraine) Artem Pustovyi	Monbus Obradoiro	17.2

=== Points ===
Pos	Player	Club	PPG
1	(United States) Markus Howard	Baskonia	19.4
2	(United States) Kyle Guy	Lenovo Tenerife	18.0
3	(Dominican Republic) Jean Montero	MoraBanc Andorra	15.7
4	(United States) Jerrick Harding	MoraBanc Andorra	15.5
5	(Nigeria) Ike Iroegbu	Bàsquet Girona	15.3

=== Rebounds ===
Pos	Player	Club	RPG
1	(Cape Verde) Edy Tavares	Real Madrid	7.3
2	(Croatia) Ante Tomić	Joventut Badalona	6.7
3	(Nigeria) Chima Moneke	Baskonia	6.6
4	(Lithuania) Tadas Sedekerskis	Baskonia	6.3
5	(Spain) Willy Hernangómez	Barça	6.2

=== Assists ===
Pos	Player	Club	APG
1	(Brazil) Marcelinho Huertas	Lenovo Tenerife	6.4
2	(Bulgaria) Codi Miller-McIntyre	Baskonia	5.9
3	(Argentina) Facundo Campazzo	Real Madrid	5.6
4	(Netherlands) Keye van der Vuurst	Zunder Palencia	5.6
5	(Canada) Trae Bell-Haynes	Casademont Zaragoza	5.3

Source: ACB

== Attendances to arenas ==
=== Average attendances ===
Pos	Team	Total	High	Low	Average	Change
1	Unicaja	208,599	10,681	8,985	9,933	+9.1%
2	Baskonia	153,803	15,504	6,242	9,047	+3.1%
3	Surne Bilbao Basket	142,569	9,897	6,138	8,386	+6.9%
4	Real Madrid	189,013	12,025	6,123	8,592	+13.7%
5	Coviran Granada	127,126	8,336	6,172	7,478	+13.6%
6	Joventut Badalona	114,178	12,193	3,200	6,716	−5.7%
7	Dreamland Gran Canaria	116,069	9,103	5,013	6,448	+11.3%
8	UCAM Murcia	134,830	7,500	4,718	6,420	+20.8%
9	Valencia Basket	118,467	7,993	4,570	6,235	+6.7%
10	Casademont Zaragoza	97,230	7,433	4,420	5,719	−1.4%
11	Barça	106,668	7,726	3,286	5,614	−6.0%
12	Monbus Obradoiro	88,618	6,000	4,632	5,213	+0.3%
13	Río Breogán	87,689	5,310	4,855	5,158	+2.0%
14	Bàsquet Girona	84,639	5,269	4,178	4,979	+1.0%
15	Zunder Palencia	84,047	5,015	4,700	4,944	n/a^{1}
16	Lenovo Tenerife	88,904	5,197	4,213	4,939	+1.2%
17	Baxi Manresa	87,449	5,000	4,460	4,858	+3.5%
18	MoraBanc Andorra	65,031	4,827	2,456	3,825	n/a^{1}
	League total	2,094,929	15,504	2,456	6,426	+4.3%

Source: ACB
Notes:
1: Team played previous season in LEB Oro.

== Awards ==
All official awards of the 2023–24 ACB season.

=== MVP ===
Pos.	Player	Team
PG	(Argentina) Facundo Campazzo	Real Madrid

=== Finals MVP ===
Pos.	Player	Team
SF	(Bosnia and Herzegovina) Džanan Musa	Real Madrid

=== All-ACB Teams ===
Pos.	First Team		Second Team	
Pos.	Player	Team	Player	Team
PG	(Argentina) Facundo Campazzo	Real Madrid	(Brazil) Marcelinho Huertas	Lenovo Tenerife
SG	(Dominican Republic) Andrés Feliz	Joventut Badalona	(Dominican Republic) Jean Montero	MoraBanc Andorra
SF	(United States) Markus Howard	Baskonia	(Senegal) Brancou Badio	Baxi Manresa
PF	(Germany) Dylan Osetkowski	Unicaja	(Argentina) Nicolás Brussino	Dreamland Gran Canaria
C	(Georgia (country)) Giorgi Shermadini	Lenovo Tenerife	(Nigeria) Chima Moneke	Baskonia

=== Best Young Player ===
Pos.	Player	Team
PG	(Dominican Republic) Jean Montero	MoraBanc Andorra

=== Best All-Young Team ===
Pos.	Player	Team
PG	(Dominican Republic) Jean Montero	MoraBanc Andorra
SG	(Spain) Lucas Langarita	Casademont Zaragoza
SF	(Netherlands) Yannick Kraag	Joventut Badalona
PF	(The Gambia) Musa Sagnia	Baxi Manresa
C	(Argentina) Juan Fernández	Río Breogán

=== Best Defender ===
Pos.	Player	Team
C	(Cape Verde) Edy Tavares	Real Madrid

=== Player of the round ===
Round	Player	Team	PIR
1	(United States) Markus Howard	Baskonia	32
2	(Bosnia and Herzegovina) Džanan Musa	Real Madrid	31
3	(Sweden) Simon Birgander	UCAM Murcia	32
4	(Nigeria) Chima Moneke	Baskonia	37
5	(Estonia) Kristian Kullamäe	Surne Bilbao Basket	33
6	(Canada) Thomas Scrubb	Monbus Obradoiro	32
6	(United States) Joe Thomasson	Coviran Granada	32
7	(Canada) Trae Bell-Haynes	Casademont Zaragoza	32
8	(Argentina) Nicolás Brussino	Dreamland Gran Canaria	34
9	(Nigeria) Ike Iroegbu	Bàsquet Girona	30
10	(Spain) Christian Díaz	Coviran Granada	30
11	(Spain) Willy Hernangómez	Barça	36
12	(Sweden) Melwin Pantzar	Surne Bilbao Basket	32
13	(Spain) Jaime Fernández	Lenovo Tenerife	34
14	(Dominican Republic) Jean Montero	MoraBanc Andorra	32
15	(Nigeria) Chima Moneke (2)	Baskonia	42
16	(Nigeria) Chima Moneke (3)	Baskonia	31
17	(Georgia (country)) Giorgi Shermadini	Lenovo Tenerife	32
17	(Poland) A. J. Slaughter	Dreamland Gran Canaria	32
18	(Latvia) Anžejs Pasečņiks	Zunder Palencia	38
19	(Latvia) Anžejs Pasečņiks (2)	Zunder Palencia	34
20	(Dominican Republic) Jean Montero (2)	MoraBanc Andorra	37
21	(France) Vincent Poirier	Real Madrid	37
22	(Montenegro) Marko Todorović	UCAM Murcia	39
23	(Spain) Willy Hernangómez (2)	Barça	44
24	(Spain) Álex Reyes	Surne Bilbao Basket	30
25	(Georgia (country)) Giorgi Shermadini (2)	Lenovo Tenerife	37
26	(Georgia (country)) Giorgi Shermadini (3)	Lenovo Tenerife	38
27	(France) Vincent Poirier (2)	Real Madrid	32
28	(Armenia) Chris Jones	Valencia Basket	37
29	(Georgia (country)) Giorgi Shermadini (4)	Lenovo Tenerife	43
30	(Croatia) Ante Tomić	Joventut Badalona	34
31	(Lithuania) Tadas Sedekerskis	Baskonia	36
32	(Canada) Khem Birch	Bàsquet Girona	30
33	(Serbia) Vanja Marinković	Baskonia	39
34	(Dominican Republic) Jean Montero (3)	MoraBanc Andorra	47

=== Player of the month ===
Month	Rounds	Player	Team	PIR	W–L	Ref
September	1–3	(Bosnia and Herzegovina) Džanan Musa	Real Madrid	22.3	3–0	
October	4–7	(Cape Verde) Edy Tavares	Real Madrid	23.3	4–0	
November	8–11	(Argentina) Nicolás Brussino	Dreamland Gran Canaria	26.8	3–1	
December	12–16	(Nigeria) Chima Moneke	Baskonia	25.4	3–2	
January	17–20	(Georgia (country)) Giorgi Shermadini	Lenovo Tenerife	24.3	3–1	
February	21–22	(Montenegro) Marko Todorović	UCAM Murcia	29.0	2–0	
March	23–27	(Georgia (country)) Giorgi Shermadini (2)	Lenovo Tenerife	22.4	4–1	
April	28–31	(Dominican Republic) Jean Montero	MoraBanc Andorra	23.5	3–1	
May	32–34	(Ukraine) Artem Pustovyi	Monbus Obradoiro	22.3	3–0	

== ACB clubs in international competitions ==
Euroleague Basketball competitions
Team	Competition	Progress	Result	W–L
Real Madrid	EuroLeague	Championship game	Loss vs. (Hellenic Basketball Federation) Panathinaikos AKTOR	31–8
Real Madrid	EuroLeague	Semifinals	Win vs. (Hellenic Basketball Federation) Olympiacos	31–8
Real Madrid	EuroLeague	Playoffs	3–0 vs. (Spanish Basketball Federation) Baskonia	31–8
Real Madrid	EuroLeague	Regular season	1st of 18 teams (27–7)	31–8
Barça	EuroLeague	Playoffs	2–3 vs. (Hellenic Basketball Federation) Olympiacos	24–15
Barça	EuroLeague	Regular season	4th of 18 teams (22–12)	24–15
Baskonia	EuroLeague	Playoffs	0–3 vs. (Spanish Basketball Federation) Real Madrid	19–20
Baskonia	EuroLeague	Play-in C	Win vs. (Italian Basketball Federation) Virtus Segafredo Bologna	19–20
Baskonia	EuroLeague	Play-in A	Loss vs. (Israeli Basketball Association) Maccabi Playtika Tel Aviv	19–20
Baskonia	EuroLeague	Regular season	8th of 18 teams (18–16)	19–20
Valencia Basket	EuroLeague	Regular season	13th of 18 teams (14–20)	14–20
Joventut Badalona	EuroCup	Quarterfinals	Loss vs. (French Federation of Basketball) Paris Basketball	11–9
Joventut Badalona	EuroCup	Eighthfinals	Win vs. (German Basketball Federation) ratiopharm Ulm	11–9
Joventut Badalona	EuroCup	Regular season Group A	5th of 10 teams (10–8)	11–9
Dreamland Gran Canaria	EuroCup	Eighthfinals	Loss vs. (Turkish Basketball Federation) Beşiktaş Emlakjet	12–7
Dreamland Gran Canaria	EuroCup	Regular season Group B	3rd of 10 teams (12–6)	12–7

FIBA competitions
Team	Competition	Progress	Result	W–L
Unicaja	Champions League	Final	Win vs. (Spanish Basketball Federation) Lenovo Tenerife	14–2
Unicaja	Champions League	Semi-finals	Win vs. (Spanish Basketball Federation) UCAM Murcia	14–2
Unicaja	Champions League	Quarter-finals	2–0 vs. (Hellenic Basketball Federation) Promitheas	14–2
Unicaja	Champions League	Round of 16 Group I	1st of 4 teams (6–0)	14–2
Unicaja	Champions League	Regular season Group A	1st of 4 teams (4–2)	14–2
Lenovo Tenerife	Champions League	Final	Loss vs. (Spanish Basketball Federation) Unicaja	11–6
Lenovo Tenerife	Champions League	Semi-finals	Win vs. (Hellenic Basketball Federation) Peristeri bwin	11–6
Lenovo Tenerife	Champions League	Quarter-finals	2–1 vs. (Turkish Basketball Federation) Tofaş	11–6
Lenovo Tenerife	Champions League	Round of 16 Group K	1st of 4 teams (4–2)	11–6
Lenovo Tenerife	Champions League	Regular season Group C	1st of 4 teams (4–2)	11–6
UCAM Murcia	Champions League	Third place game	Win vs. (Hellenic Basketball Federation) Peristeri bwin	12–4
UCAM Murcia	Champions League	Semi-finals	Loss vs. (Spain) Unicaja	12–4
UCAM Murcia	Champions League	Quarter-finals	2–0 vs. (German Basketball Federation) MHP Riesen Ludwigsburg	12–4
UCAM Murcia	Champions League	Round of 16 Group L	1st of 4 teams (4–2)	12–4
UCAM Murcia	Champions League	Regular season Group H	1st of 4 teams (5–1)	12–4
Río Breogán	Champions League	Play-ins	1–2 vs. (Turkish Basketball Federation) Pınar Karşıyaka	4–5
Río Breogán	Champions League	Regular season Group F	3rd of 4 teams (3–3)	4–5
Monbus Obradoiro	Champions League	Qualifying tournament 3 Final	Loss vs. (French Federation of Basketball) SIG Strasbourg	2–1
Monbus Obradoiro	Champions League	Qualifying tournament 3 Semi-finals	Win vs. (Polish Basketball Federation) Legia Warszawa	2–1
Monbus Obradoiro	Champions League	Qualifying tournament 3 Quarter-finals	Win vs. (Basketball Federation of Montenegro) Mornar Barsko Zlato	2–1
Surne Bilbao Basket	FIBA Europe Cup	Semi-finals	Loss vs. (German Basketball Federation) Niners Chemnitz	13–3
Surne Bilbao Basket	FIBA Europe Cup	Quarter-finals	Win vs. (Polish Basketball Federation) Legia Warszawa	13–3
Surne Bilbao Basket	FIBA Europe Cup	Second round Group K	1st of 4 teams (5–1)	13–3
Surne Bilbao Basket	FIBA Europe Cup	Regular season Group B	1st of 4 teams (6–0)	13–3
Casademont Zaragoza	FIBA Europe Cup	Quarter-finals	Loss vs. (German Basketball Federation) Niners Chemnitz	9–5
Casademont Zaragoza	FIBA Europe Cup	Second round Group M	2nd of 4 teams (4–2)	9–5
Casademont Zaragoza	FIBA Europe Cup	Regular season Group F	1st of 3 teams (3–1)	9–5
Casademont Zaragoza	FIBA Europe Cup	Qualifying tournament G	1st of 3 teams (2–0)	9–5
