= 2023–24 Basketball Champions League playoffs =

The 2023–24 playoffs of the FIBA Basketball Champions League will begin on April 3, 2024. It is to decide the champions of the 2023–24 Basketball Champions League. A total of eight teams will compete in the play-offs.

== Format ==
The 8 qualified clubs have been ranked according to their final position within their respective group during the Round of 16 and their place in the Draw was based on this ranking. The teams having finished 1st of their Round of 16 group was placed in Pot 1, the teams having finished 2nd of their Round of 16 group was placed in Pot 2. The draw was held on March 21, 2024.

The quarterfinals will be played in a best-of-3 series and start on April 3. The seeded teams will play their first (and potential third) game at home, the unseeded teams will play their second game at home.

The four winning clubs will qualify for the Final Four. The 4 qualified teams will play the final four between April 26-28, 2024.

== Qualified teams ==
Key to colors
Seeded teams	Unseeded teams

Group	Winners	Runners-up
I	(Spain) Unicaja	(Turkey) Tofaş
J	(Germany) Telekom Baskets Bonn	(Germany) MHP Riesen Ludwigsburg
K	(Spain) Lenovo Tenerife	(Greece) Peristeri
L	(Spain) UCAM Murcia	(Greece) Promitheas

== Bracket ==
Quarterfinals
(Spain) Lenovo Tenerife	83	81	78
(Turkey) Tofaş	77	90	55
(Germany) Telekom Baskets Bonn	89	62	77
(Greece) Peristeri	78	90	89
(Spain) UCAM Murcia	98	85	—
(Germany) MHP Riesen Ludwigsburg	72	72	—
(Spain) Unicaja	67	90	—
(Greece) Promitheas	54	83	—

Semifinals
26 April
(Spain) Lenovo Tenerife	97
(Greece) Peristeri	93
26 April
(Spain) UCAM Murcia	74
(Spain) Unicaja	80

Final
28 April
(Spain) Lenovo Tenerife	75
(Spain) Unicaja	80
Third place
28 April
(Greece) Peristeri	84
(Spain) UCAM Murcia	87

== Quarterfinals ==
Team 1	Series	Team 2	Game 1	Game 2	Game 3
Lenovo Tenerife (Spain)	2–1	(Turkey) Tofaş	83–77	81–90	78–55
Telekom Baskets Bonn (Germany)	1–2	(Greece) Peristeri	89–78	62–90	77–89
UCAM Murcia (Spain)	2–0	(Germany) MHP Riesen Ludwigsburg	98–72	85–72	—
Unicaja (Spain)	2–0	(Greece) Promitheas	67–54	90–83	—

=== Lenovo Tenerife vs. Tofaş ===
3 April 2024	Lenovo Tenerife (Spain)	83–77 (Series: 1–0)	(Turkey) Tofaş	Tenerife
20:00	Scoring by quarter: 21–16, 10–19, 24–20, 28–22
	Pts: Huertas 30; Rebs: Abromaitis 6 Asts: Huertas 8 Eff: Huertas 31	Boxscore	Pts: O'Brien 21; Rebs: Wiley 10; Asts: Winston 6 Eff: O'Brien, Winston 24	Arena: Santiago Martín; Referees: Yohan Rosso (FRA), Boris Krejic (SVN), Martin Horozov (BUL)

10 April 2024	Tofaş (Turkey)	90–81 (Series: 1–1)	(Spain) Lenovo Tenerife	Bursa
18:00	Scoring by quarter: 21–26, 22–12, 25–25, 22–18
	Pts: Homesley 26; Rebs: Prewitt 6 Asts: Winston 5 Eff: Homesley 29	Boxscore	Pts: Guy 34; Rebs: Doornekamp 8 Asts: Huertas 6 Eff: Guy 25	Arena: Tofaş Nilüfer Spor Salonu; Referees: Wojciech Liszka (POL), Martins Kozlovskis (LAT), Gatis Salins (LAT)

17 April 2024	Lenovo Tenerife (Spain)	78–55 (Series: 2–1)	(Turkey) Tofaş	Tenerife
20:00	Scoring by quarter: 26–11, 21–20, 18–10, 13–14
	Eff:	Boxscore	Eff:	Arena: Santiago Martín

=== Telekom Baskets Bonn vs. Peristeri ===
3 April 2024	Telekom Baskets Bonn (Germany)	89–78 (Series: 1–0)	(Greece) Peristeri	Bonn
19:00	Scoring by quarter: 22–24, 23–20, 28–16, 16–18
	Pts: Griesel 19; Rebs: Kennedy 8 Asts: Watson 9 Eff: Kirkwood 22	Boxscore	Pts: Mitrou-Long 22; Rebs: Thompson 13; Asts: Ragland 6 Eff: Mitrou-Long 20	Arena: Telekom Dome; Referees: Martins Kozlovskis (LAT), Luis Miguel Castillo (ESP), Martin Vulic (CRO)

10 April 2024	Peristeri (Greece)	90–62 (Series: 1–1)	(Germany) Telekom Baskets Bonn	Peristeri
18:30	Scoring by quarter: 19–14, 27–20, 23–14, 21–14
	Pts: Ragland 21; Rebs: Dangubic, Chougkaz 6 Asts: Ragland 9 Eff: Ragland 27	Boxscore	Pts: Watson, Pape 13; Rebs: Watson 8 Asts: Watson 6 Eff: Watson 15	Arena: Peristeri Arena; Referees: Antonio Conde (ESP), Marius Ciulin (ROU), Beniamino Attard (ITA)

16 April 2024	Telekom Baskets Bonn (Germany)	77–89 (Series: 1–2)	(Greece) Peristeri	Bonn
20:00	Scoring by quarter: 17–27, 26–24, 19–16, 15–22
	Pts: Frey 21; Rebs: Kennedy 7 Asts: Kennedy, Kirkwood 4 Eff: Frey, Kennedy 15	Boxscore	Pts: Ragland 21; Rebs: Thompson 11; Asts: Ragland 8 Eff: Thompson 26	Arena: Telekom Dome; Referees: Wojciech Liszka (POL), Martins Kozlovskis (LAT), Gatis Salins (LAT)

=== UCAM Murcia vs. MHP Riesen Ludwigsburg ===
3 April 2024	UCAM Murcia (Spain)	98–72 (Series: 1–0)	(Germany) MHP Riesen Ludwigsburg	Murcia
18:30	Scoring by quarter: 27–14, 17–19, 27–22, 27–17
	Pts: Kurucs 18; Rebs: Sleva, Diagne 5 Asts: Ennis 8 Eff: Todorović 21	Boxscore	Pts: Graves 16; Rebs: Graves 6 Asts: Melson 4 Eff: Graves 13	Arena: Palacio de Deportes; Referees: Manuel Mazzoni (ITA), Gatis Salins (LVA), Kerem Baki (TUR)

9 April 2024	MHP Riesen Ludwigsburg (Germany)	72–85 (Series: 0–2)	(Spain) UCAM Murcia	Ludwigsburg
20:00	Scoring by quarter: 20–25, 17–22, 21–17, 14–21
	Pts: Buie 15; Rebs: Hukporti 10; Asts: Buie 4 Eff: Edigin 18	Boxscore	Pts: Todorović 17; Rebs: Radebaugh, Birgander, Todorović 6 Asts: Sant-Roos 5 Eff: Radebaugh 20	Arena: MHP Arena; Referees: Yohan Rosso (FRA), Nicolas Maestre (FRA), Lorenzo Baldini (ITA)

=== Unicaja vs. Promitheas ===
3 April 2024	Unicaja (Spain)	67–54 (Series: 1–0)	(Greece) Promitheas	Málaga
21:00	Scoring by quarter: 22–10, 20–12, 8–16, 17–16
	Pts: Perry 13; Rebs: Osetkowski 12; Asts: Thomas 4 Eff: Osetkowski 18	Boxscore	Pts: Hale 14; Rebs: Coffey, Hale 7 Asts: Hale 8 Eff: Hale 17	Arena: Palacio de Deportes José María Martín Carpena; Referees: Ademir Zurapović (BIH), Paulo Marques (POR), Lorenzo Baldini (ITA)

9 April 2024	Promitheas (Greece)	83–90 (Series: 0–2)	(Spain) Unicaja	Patras
18:30	Scoring by quarter: 26–23, 17–23, 11–19, 29–25
	Pts: Hale 31; Rebs: Chrysikopoulos 4 Asts: Cowan Jr., Bazinas, Hale 3 Eff: Hale 28	Boxscore	Pts: Kalinoski 23; Rebs: Lima, Thomas 5 Asts: Díaz 5 Eff: Kravish 21	Arena: Dimitris Tofalos Arena; Referees: Manuel Mazzoni (ITA), Boris Krejić (SVN), Michał Proc (POL)
