= 2024 ACB Playoffs =

Spanish basketball postseason tournament

Tournament details
- Country: Spain
- Dates: 15 May–16 June 2024
- Teams: 8
- Defending champions: Barça

Final positions
- Champions: Real Madrid; 15th ACB title 37th Spanish title
- Runners-up: UCAM Murcia
- Semifinalists: Unicaja; Barça

Tournament statistics
- Matches played: 21
- Attendance: 169,382 (8,066 per match)

The 2024 ACB Playoffs, also known as 2024 Liga Endesa Playoffs for sponsorship reasons, were the postseason tournament of the ACB's 2023–24 season, which began on 23 September 2023. The playoffs started on May 15 and ended on June 12.

Barça was the defending champion, but was eliminated in the semifinals after a 0–3 sweep by Real Madrid in a rematch of last year's finals, with Los Blancos winning a record-extending 37th title (15th in the ACB era) after another sweep against UCAM Murcia in the finals series.

== Format ==
At the end of the regular season, the eight teams with the most wins qualify for the playoffs. The seedings are based on each team's record.

The bracket is fixed; there is no reseeding. The quarterfinals are best-of-three series; the team that wins two games advances to the next round. This round is in a 1–1–1 format. From the semifinals onward, the rounds are best-of-five series; the team that wins three games advances to the next round. These rounds, including the Finals, are in a 2–2–1 format. Home court advantage in any round belong to the higher-seeded team.

== Playoff qualifying ==
On March 24, 2024, Real Madrid became the first team to clinch a playoff spot.

Seed	Team	Record	Clinched		
Seed	Team	Record	Playoff berth	Seeded team	Top seed
1	Unicaja	28–6	April 7	April 20	May 12
2	Real Madrid	28–6	March 24	April 14	–
3	Barça	23–11	April 20	May 5	–
4	Valencia Basket	21–13	May 4	May 12	–
5	UCAM Murcia	21–13	May 5	–	–
6	Lenovo Tenerife	21–13	May 5	–	–
7	Dreamland Gran Canaria	20–14	April 27	–	–
8	Baxi Manresa	19–15	May 12	–	–

== Bracket ==
Teams in bold advanced to the next round. The numbers to the left of each team indicate the team's seeding, the numbers to the right indicate the result of games including result in bold of the team that won in that game, and the numbers furthest to the right indicate the number of games the team won in that round.

Quarterfinals
**2**	**Real Madrid**	**105**	**73**	**2**
7	Dreamland Gran Canaria	70	71	0
**3**	**Barça**	**96**	**97**	**2**
6	Lenovo Tenerife	86	92	0
**1**	**Unicaja**	**87**	**86**	**2**
8	Baxi Manresa	79	63	0
4	Valencia Basket	86	**83**	77	1
**5**	**UCAM Murcia**	**96**	72	**84**	**2**

Semifinals
**2**	**Real Madrid**	**97**	**104**	**95**	**3**
3	Barça	78	98	92	0
1	Unicaja	79	83	**74**	**88**	70	2
**5**	**UCAM Murcia**	**88**	**101**	66	79	**79**	**3**

Finals
**2**	**Real Madrid**	**84**	**79**	**84**	**3**
5	UCAM Murcia	76	63	73	0

Source: ACB

== Quarterfinals ==
All times are in Central European Summer Time (UTC+02:00)

=== Unicaja v Baxi Manresa ===
16 May 2024	**Unicaja**	**87**–79 (Series: **1–0**)	Baxi Manresa	Málaga
20:30	Scoring by quarter: 18–**24**, 16–16, **18**–16, **35**–23
	Pts: Kalinoski 11; Rebs: Kravish 6 Asts: Kalinoski 7 PIR: Ejim, Kalinoski 17	Boxscore	Pts: Robinson 15; Rebs: Robinson 9 Asts: three players 4 PIR: Oriola 23	Arena: Martín Carpena; Attendance: 10,443; Referees: Juan Carlos García González, Martín Caballero, Francisco Araña

21 May 2024	Baxi Manresa	63–**86** (Series: **0–2**)	**Unicaja**	Manresa
20:30	Scoring by quarter: **28**–20, 8–**20**, 11–**25**, 16–**21**
	Pts: Williams 12; Rebs: Oriola, Robinson 5 Asts: Pérez, Williams 4 PIR: Williams 13	Boxscore	Pts: Kravish 12; Rebs: Sima 6 Asts: Carter 9 PIR: Carter 20	Arena: Nou Congost; Attendance: 4,903; Referees: Emilio Pérez Pizarro, Rafael Serrano, Iyán González

Regular season series
Unicaja won 2–0 in the regular season series

2 December 2023

Boxscore

**Unicaja**	**91**–77	Baxi Manresa

Martín Carpena, Málaga

7 April 2024

Boxscore

Baxi Manresa	77–**88**	**Unicaja**

Nou Congost, Manresa

This was the fifth playoff meeting between these two teams, with each team winning two out of the first four meetings.

Previous playoff series
Tied 2–2 in all-time playoff series

1988

TDK Manresa	2–**3**	**Caja de Ronda**

1988 relegation playoffs

1994

Unicaja Polti	0–**2**	**TDK Manresa**

1994 Eighthfinals

1995

**Unicaja**	**3**–0	TDK Manresa

1995 Semifinals

1996

Unicaja	1–**2**	**TDK Manresa**

1996 Quarterfinals

=== Real Madrid v Dreamland Gran Canaria ===
15 May 2024	**Real Madrid**	**105**–70 (Series: **1–0**)	Dreamland Gran Canaria	Madrid
20:30	Scoring by quarter: **27**–25, **19**–13, **31**–15, **28**–17
	Pts: Musa 26; Rebs: Poirier, Campazzo 5 Asts: Campazzo 7 PIR: Musa 28	Boxscore	Pts: Shurna 12; Rebs: four players 4 Asts: Bassas 5 PIR: Salvó 19	Arena: WiZink Center; Attendance: 7,516; Referees: Fernando Calatrava, Carlos Cortés, Alberto Sánchez Sixto

17 May 2024	Dreamland Gran Canaria	71–**73** (Series: **0–2**)	**Real Madrid**	Las Palmas
20:30	Scoring by quarter: 18–**25**, 15–**18**, **25**–17, 13–13
	Pts: Shurna 19; Rebs: Salvó 8 Asts: Bassas 4 PIR: Shurna 18	Boxscore	Pts: Tavares 13; Rebs: Tavares 8 Asts: Campazzo 5 PIR: Tavares 20	Arena: Gran Canaria Arena; Attendance: 6,382; Referees: Carlos Peruga, Javier Torres, Vicente Martínez

Regular season series
Tied 1–1 in the regular season series

10 December 2023

Boxscore

**Real Madrid**	**97**–71	Dreamland Gran Canaria

WiZink Center, Madrid

28 January 2024

Boxscore

**Dreamland Gran Canaria**	**100**–77	Real Madrid

Gran Canaria Arena, Las Palmas

This was the sixth playoff meeting between these two teams, with Real Madrid winning the previous five meetings.

Previous playoff series
Madrid leads 5–0 in all-time playoff series

2000

**Real Madrid Teka**	**3**–0	Canarias Telecom

2000 Quarterfinals

2015

**Real Madrid**	**2**–0	Herbalife Gran Canaria

2015 Quarterfinals

2018

**Real Madrid**	**3**–0	Herbalife Gran Canaria

2018 Semifinals

2021

**Real Madrid**	**2**–0	Herbalife Gran Canaria

2021 Quarterfinals

2023

**Real Madrid**	**2**–0	Dreamland Gran Canaria

2023 Quarterfinals

=== Barça v Lenovo Tenerife ===
19 May 2024	**Barça**	**96**–86 (Series: **1–0**)	Lenovo Tenerife	Barcelona
12:30	Scoring by quarter: **28**–16, 22–**30**, 22–**26**, **24**–14
	Pts: Parker 23; Rebs: Parra 7 Asts: Rubio 10; PIR: Parker 26	Boxscore	Pts: Guy 34; Rebs: Guerra 9 Asts: Huertas 10; PIR: Guy 29	Arena: Palau Blaugrana; Attendance: 6,033; Referees: Benjamín Jiménez, Luis Miguel Castillo, Yasmina Alcaraz

23 May 2024	Lenovo Tenerife	92–**97** (Series: **0–2**)	**Barça**	San Cristóbal de La Laguna
20:30	Scoring by quarter: 21–**22**, **25**–22, 25–**28**, 21–**25**
	Pts: Fitipaldo 20; Rebs: Abromaitis 10; Asts: Fitipaldo 7 PIR: Fitipaldo 20	Boxscore	Pts: Satoranský 24; Rebs: Veselý 5 Asts: Veselý, Jokubaitis 4 PIR: Satoranský 28	Arena: Santiago Martín; Attendance: 5,121; Referees: Antonio Conde, Alfonso Olivares, Cristóbal Sánchez

Regular season series
Barça won 2–0 in the regular season series

12 November 2023

Boxscore

**Barça**	**94**–83	Lenovo Tenerife

Palau Blaugrana, Barcelona

14 January 2024

Boxscore

Lenovo Tenerife	80–**83**	**Barça**

Santiago Martín, San Cristóbal de La Laguna

This was the second playoff meeting between these two teams, with Barça winning the previous meeting.

Previous playoff series
Barça leads 1–0 in all-time playoff series

2021

**Barça**	**2**–1	Lenovo Tenerife

2021 Semifinals

=== Valencia Basket v UCAM Murcia ===
18 May 2024	Valencia Basket	86–**96** (Series: **0–1**)	**UCAM Murcia**	Valencia
18:00	Scoring by quarter: 13–**21**, 25–**27**, **19**–17, 29–**31**
	Pts: Davies 19; Rebs: Davies 10; Asts: Jones 8 PIR: Davies 24	Boxscore	Pts: Radebaugh 24; Rebs: Diagne 11; Asts: Caupain, Sant-Roos 5 PIR: Radebaugh 30	Arena: La Fonteta; Attendance: 6,976; Referees: Óscar Perea, Sergio Manuel, Arnau Padrós

22 May 2024	UCAM Murcia	72–**83** (Series: **1–1**)	**Valencia Basket**	Murcia
20:30	Scoring by quarter: 14–**23**, **22**–20, **22**–18, 14–**22**
	Pts: Sleva 12; Rebs: Sleva 8 Asts: Ennis 4 PIR: Radović, Sleva 12	Boxscore	Pts: Davies 17; Rebs: Claver 6 Asts: Jović 9 PIR: Jović 24	Arena: Palacio de Deportes; Attendance: 7,007; Referees: Miguel Ángel Pérez Pérez, Jordi Aliaga, Joaquín García

25 May 2024	Valencia Basket	77–**84** (Series: **1–2**)	**UCAM Murcia**	Valencia
20:45	Scoring by quarter: **27**–26, 17–17, **19**–18, 14–**23**
	Pts: Davies 23; Rebs: Ojeleye 6 Asts: Jović 5 PIR: Davies 19	Boxscore	Pts: Radebaugh 20; Rebs: Sleva 7 Asts: Sleva 5 PIR: Radebaugh 20	Arena: La Fonteta; Attendance: 7,582; Referees: Emilio Pérez Pizarro, Martín Caballero, Rafael Serrano

Regular season series
Valencia won 2–0 in the regular season series

10 December 2023

Boxscore

UCAM Murcia	77–**85**	**Valencia Basket**

Palacio de Deportes, Murcia

24 March 2024

Boxscore

**Valencia Basket**	**83**–82	UCAM Murcia

La Fonteta, Valencia

This was the first meeting in the playoffs between Valencia Basket and UCAM Murcia.

== Semifinals ==
All times are in Central European Summer Time (UTC+02:00)

=== Unicaja v UCAM Murcia ===
28 May 2024	Unicaja	79–**88** (Series: **0–1**)	**UCAM Murcia**	Málaga
20:30	Scoring by quarter: 21–**24**, 15–**17**, **27**–26, 16–**21**
	Pts: Ejim, Kalinoski 15; Rebs: Osetkowski 7 Asts: Díaz 4 PIR: Ejim 22	Boxscore	Pts: Sleva 23; Rebs: Morin 9 Asts: Håkanson 6 PIR: Ennis, Sleva 22	Arena: Martín Carpena; Attendance: 10,681; Referees: Miguel Ángel Pérez Pérez, Óscar Perea, Arnau Padrós

30 May 2024	Unicaja	83–**101** (Series: **0–2**)	**UCAM Murcia**	Málaga
20:30	Scoring by quarter: 21–**25**, **24**–19, 16–**30**, 22–**27**
	Pts: Díaz 15; Rebs: Sima 5 Asts: Díaz, Perry 4 PIR: Díaz 18	Boxscore	Pts: Kurucs 21; Rebs: Sleva 7 Asts: Håkanson 6 PIR: Kurucs 27	Arena: Martín Carpena; Attendance: 10,681; Referees: Juan Carlos García González, Martín Caballero, Francisco Araña

1 June 2024	UCAM Murcia	66–**74** (Series: **2–1**)	**Unicaja**	Murcia
18:00	Scoring by quarter: 9–**25**, **15**–14, 20–**26**, **22**–9
	Pts: Sleva 15; Rebs: Morin 9 Asts: three players 2 PIR: Sleva 16	Boxscore	Pts: Osetkowski 18; Rebs: Sima 12; Asts: Taylor 4 PIR: Sima 21	Arena: Palacio de Deportes; Attendance: 7,500; Referees: Benjamín Jiménez, Rafael Serrano, Sergio Manuel

3 June 2024	UCAM Murcia	79–**88** (Series: **2–2**)	**Unicaja**	Murcia
20:30	Scoring by quarter: 18–**31**, **25**–24, **20**–17, 16–16
	Pts: Kurucs 26; Rebs: Kurucs, Morin 7 Asts: Kurucs 4 PIR: Kurucs 32	Boxscore	Pts: Osetkowski 22; Rebs: Osetkowski 5 Asts: Perry 7 PIR: Osetkowski 28	Arena: Palacio de Deportes; Attendance: 7,500; Referees: Miguel Ángel Pérez Pérez, Martín Caballero, Arnau Padrós

5 June 2024	Unicaja	70–**79** (Series: **2–3**)	**UCAM Murcia**	Málaga
20:30	Scoring by quarter: **25**–14, 7–**17**, 20–**24**, 18–**24**
	Pts: Perry 14; Rebs: Kalinoski 9 Asts: Díaz, Perry 4 PIR: Osetkowski 14	Boxscore	Pts: Caupain, Ennis 19; Rebs: Sleva 7 Asts: four players 2 PIR: Ennis 23	Arena: Martín Carpena; Attendance: 10,681; Referees: Benjamín Jiménez, Óscar Perea, Carlos Cortés

Regular season series
Unicaja won 2–0 in the regular season series

22 December 2023

Boxscore

UCAM Murcia	65–**88**	**Unicaja**

Palacio de Deportes, Murcia

5 May 2024

Boxscore

**Unicaja**	**96**–71	UCAM Murcia

Martín Carpena, Málaga

This was the first playoff meeting between Unicaja and UCAM Murcia.

=== Real Madrid v Barça ===
29 May 2024	**Real Madrid**	**97**–78 (Series: **1–0**)	Barça	Madrid
20:30	Scoring by quarter: **24**–14, 20–**22**, **28**–26, **25**–16
	Pts: Campazzo 20; Rebs: Tavares 15; Asts: Campazzo 10; PIR: Tavares 35	Boxscore	Pts: Laprovíttola 13; Rebs: da Silva 7 Asts: Rubio 10; PIR: Rubio 22	Arena: WiZink Center; Attendance: 11,274; Referees: Carlos Peruga, Jordi Aliaga, Luis Miguel Castillo

31 May 2024	**Real Madrid**	**104**–98 (Series: **2–0**)	Barça	Madrid
20:30	Scoring by quarter: 22–**24**, **22**–16, **29**–22, 31–**36**
	Pts: Llull, Musa 18; Rebs: Tavares 9 Asts: Hezonja 6 PIR: Hezonja 23	Boxscore	Pts: Veselý 24; Rebs: Rubio 5 Asts: Satoranský 11; PIR: Satoranský 26	Arena: WiZink Center; Attendance: 12,025; Referees: Emilio Pérez Pizarro, Fernando Calatrava, Alberto Sánchez Sixto

2 June 2024	Barça	92–**95** (Series: **0–3**)	**Real Madrid**	Barcelona
18:30	Scoring by quarter: 20–**28**, **25**–21, **31**–23, 16–**23**
	Pts: Parker 27; Rebs: Hernangómez 8 Asts: Laprovíttola 9 PIR: Parker 26	Boxscore	Pts: Campazzo 21; Rebs: Tavares, Yabusele 5 Asts: Musa 7 PIR: Campazzo 27	Arena: Palau Blaugrana; Attendance: 7,066; Referees: Antonio Conde, Javier Torres, Alfonso Olivares

Regular season series
Tied 1–1 in the regular season series

1 October 2023

Boxscore

**Real Madrid**	**86**–79	Barça

WiZink Center, Madrid

7 April 2024

Boxscore

**Barça**	**85**–79	Real Madrid

Palau Blaugrana, Barcelona

This was the 23rd playoff meeting between these two teams, with each team winning 11 out of the first 22 meetings.

Previous playoff series
Tied 11–11 in all-time playoff series

1984

**Real Madrid**	**2**–1	FC Barcelona

1984 Finals

1986

**Real Madrid**	**2**–0	FC Barcelona

1986 Finals

1987

**FC Barcelona**	**3**–1	Real Madrid

1987 Semifinals

1988

**FC Barcelona**	**3**–2	Real Madrid

1988 Finals

1989

**FC Barcelona**	**3**–2	Real Madrid

1989 Finals

1992

**Real Madrid Asegurator**	**2**–0	FC Barcelona

1992 Quarterfinals

1994

**Real Madrid Teka**	**3**–0	FC Barcelona Banca Catalana

1994 Finals

1995

**FC Barcelona Banca Catalana**	**3**–2	Real Madrid Teka

1995 Semifinals

1997

Real Madrid Teka	2–**3**	**FC Barcelona Banca Catalana**

1997 Finals

2000

FC Barcelona	2–**3**	**Real Madrid Teka**

2000 Finals

2001

**FC Barcelona**	**3**–0	Real Madrid

2001 Finals

2006

**Winterthur FC Barcelona**	**3**–1	Real Madrid

2006 Quarterfinals

2007

**Real Madrid**	**3**–1	Winterthur FC Barcelona

2007 Finals

2012

**FC Barcelona Regal**	**3**–2	Real Madrid

2012 Finals

2013

**Real Madrid**	**3**–2	FC Barcelona Regal

2013 Finals

2014

Real Madrid	1–**3**	**FC Barcelona**

2014 Finals

2015

**Real Madrid**	**3**–0	FC Barcelona

2015 Finals

2016

FC Barcelona Lassa	1–**3**	**Real Madrid**

2016 Finals

2019

**Real Madrid**	**3**–1	Barça Lassa

2019 Finals

2021

Real Madrid	0–**2**	**Barça**

2021 Finals

2022

Barça	1–**3**	**Real Madrid**

2022 Finals

2023

**Barça**	**3**–0	Real Madrid

2023 Finals

== Finals ==
All times are in Central European Summer Time (UTC+02:00)

8 June 2024	**Real Madrid**	**84**–76 (Series: **1–0**)	UCAM Murcia	Madrid
20:30	Scoring by quarter: **18**–13, 19–**20**, **27**–15, 20–**28**
	Pts: Musa 16; Rebs: Tavares 9 Asts: Campazzo 7 PIR: Musa 20	Boxscore	Pts: Caupain 16; Rebs: Sant-Roos 8 Asts: Sant-Roos 4 PIR: Sant-Roos 22	Arena: WiZink Center; Attendance: 11,134; Referees: Carlos Peruga, Rafael Serrano, Arnau Padrós

10 June 2024	**Real Madrid**	**79**–63 (Series: **2–0**)	UCAM Murcia	Madrid
20:30	Scoring by quarter: **18**–15, **22**–15, 17–**22**, **22**–11
	Pts: Fernández 14; Rebs: Tavares 12; Asts: Campazzo 5 PIR: Fernández 20	Boxscore	Pts: Sleva 13; Rebs: Morin 8 Asts: Caupain 3 PIR: Kurucs 11	Arena: WiZink Center; Attendance: 11,377; Referees: Antonio Conde, Fernando Calatrava, Sergio Manuel

12 June 2024	UCAM Murcia	73–**84** (Series: **0–3**)	**Real Madrid**	Murcia
20:30	Scoring by quarter: **19**–17, **21**–15, 16–**34**, 17–**18**
	Pts: Ennis 18; Rebs: Sant-Roos, Ennis 5 Asts: Sant-Roos, Håkanson 3 PIR: Ennis 17	Boxscore	Pts: Musa 18; Rebs: Campazzo 7 Asts: Campazzo 6 PIR: Campazzo 28	Arena: Palacio de Deportes; Attendance: 7,500; Referees: Emilio Pérez Pizarro, Óscar Perea, Alfonso Olivares

Regular season series
Tied 1–1 in the regular season series

15 October 2023

Boxscore

**Real Madrid**	**106**–92	UCAM Murcia

WiZink Center, Madrid

14 January 2024

Boxscore

**UCAM Murcia**	**73**–61	Real Madrid

Palacio de Deportes, Murcia

This was the second playoff meeting between these two teams, with Real Madrid winning the previous meeting.

Previous playoff series
Madrid leads 1–0 in all-time playoff series

2016

**Real Madrid**	**2**–1	UCAM Murcia

2016 Quarterfinals
