= 2023–24 Basketball Champions League =

European basketball competition

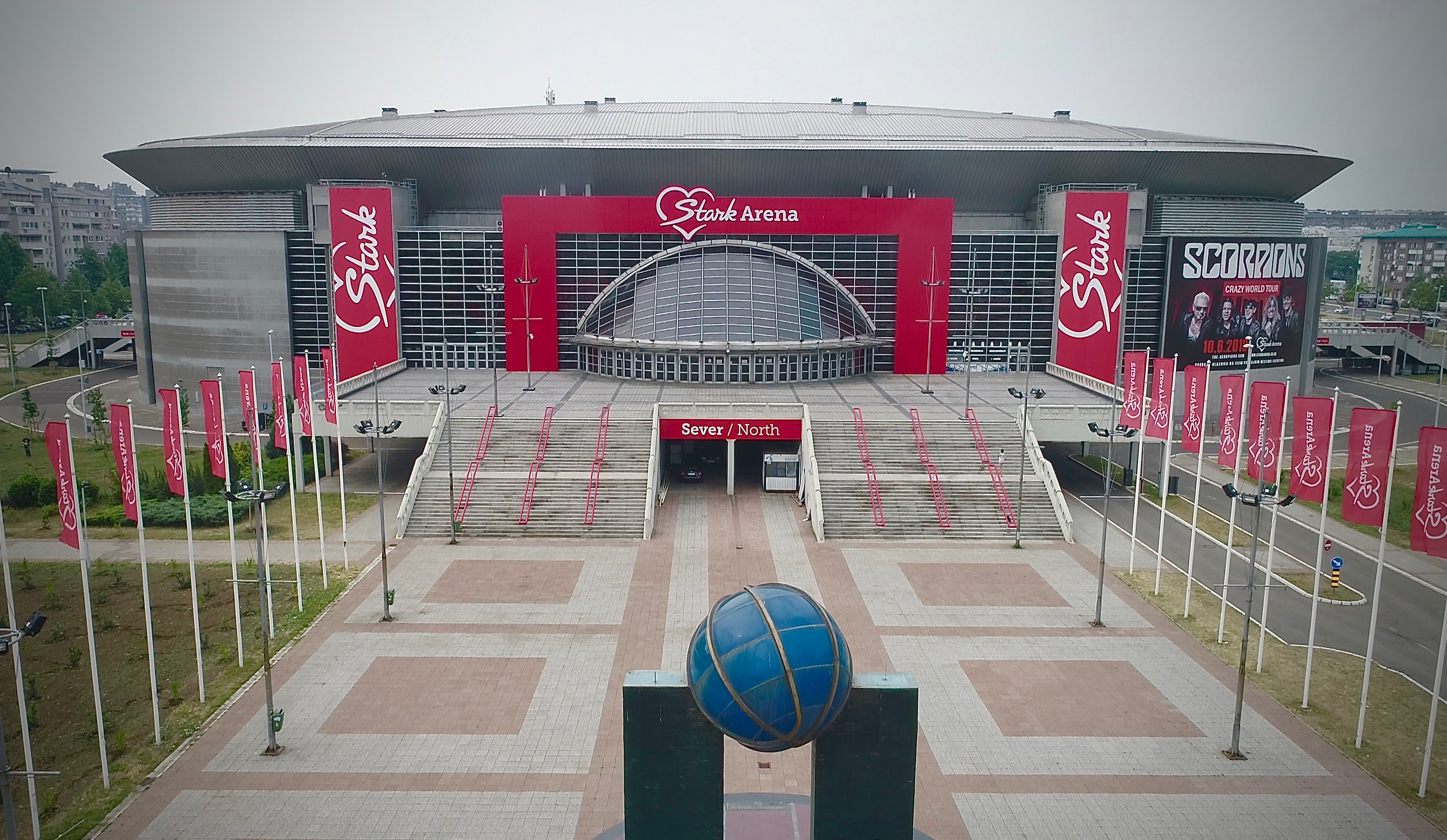
- The Štark Arena in Belgrade hosted the Final Four
- Season: 2023–24
- Dates: Qualifying: 24 September – 1 October 2023; Competition proper: 17 October 2023 – 28 April 2024
- Teams: Competition proper: 32; Total: 53 (from 28 countries)

Regular season
- Season MVP: Marcelo Huertas (Tenerife)

Finals
- Champions: (Spain) Unicaja (1st title)
- Runners-up: (Spain) Lenovo Tenerife
- Third place: (Spain) UCAM Murcia
- Fourth place: (Greece) Peristeri
- Final Four MVP: Kendrick Perry (Unicaja)

Awards
- Best Coach: Vassilis Spanoulis (Peristeri)
- Best Young Player: Tidjane Salaün (Cholet)

Statistical leaders
| Points | Kyle Guy (Tenerife) | 21.5 |
| Rebounds | Austin Wiley (Tofaş) | 8.9 |
| Assists | Joe Ragland (Peristeri) | 8.9 |

The 2023–24 Basketball Champions League was the 8th season of the Basketball Champions League (BCL), the premier European professional basketball competition for clubs launched by FIBA. The season began on 17 October 2023 and ended with the championship game on 28 April 2024.

Telekom Baskets Bonn were the defending champions, but were eliminated by Peristeri in the quarter-finals. The Štark Arena in Belgrade hosted the Final Four and the championship game, the second time the competition had a neutral venue for its conclusion. Unicaja won its first Champions League title following their win over Lenovo Tenerife in the final. As champions, Unicaja also qualified for the 2024 FIBA Intercontinental Cup.

== Team allocation ==
=== Country rankings ===
The BCL Country Ranking is used to define the number of clubs each country is entitled to enter into the various stages of the BCL.

The results are based on the results of the past three seasons (the 2020-21, 2021-22 and 2022–23 seasons).

| Rank | Association | Average points | Teams |
|---|---|---|---|
| 1 | Spain | 104.75 | 5 |
| 2 | Germany | 69.00 | 4 |
| 3 | France | 63.77 | 4 |
| 4 | Turkey | 63.20 | 5 |
| 5 | Israel | 63.00 | 3 |
| 6 | Bosnia and Herzegovina | 63.00 | 1 |
| 7 | Czech Republic | 56.00 | 1 |
| 8 | Hungary | 49.00 | 1 |
| 9 | Greece | 43.25 | 4 |
| 10 | Italy | 41.33 | 4 |
| 11 | Romania | 41.00 | 1 |
| 12 | Russia (suspended) | 40.50 | 0 |
| 13 | Latvia | 38.00 | 1 |
| 14 | Belgium | 34.50 | 2 |
| 15 | Lithuania | 34.50 | 2 |
| 16 | Ukraine | 26.00 | 0 |
| 17 | Denmark | 24.00 | 1 |
| 18 | Portugal | 21.00 | 1 |

| Rank | Association | Average points | Teams |
|---|---|---|---|
| 19 | Poland | 19.00 | 2 |
| 20 | Belarus | 15.00 | 0 |
| 21 | Estonia | 12.00 | 1 |
| 22 | Cyprus | 8.00 | 1 |
| 23 | Switzerland | 7.00 | 1 |
| 24 | Netherlands | 4.00 | 1 |
| 25 | Slovakia | 4.00 | 1 |
| 26 | Serbia | 4.00 | 1 |
| 27 | Finland | 3.00 | 1 |
| 28 | Great Britain | 3.00 | 1 |
| 29 | Austria | 3.00 | 0 |
| 30 | Croatia | 2.00 | 0 |
| 31 | Montenegro | 2.00 | 0 |
| 32 | Bulgaria | 2.00 | 0 |
| 33 | Sweden | 1.00 | 1 |
| 34 | North Macedonia | 1.00 | 0 |
| 35 | Kosovo | 1.00 | 1 |

=== Teams ===
A total of 54 teams from 29 countries participated in the 2023–24 Basketball Champions League. 15 of them were domestic champions in the previous season. Two teams were invited as a wild card entries.

If one or more clubs do not exercise their right to participate in the BCL, the FIBA may decide to allocate the respective place(s) to other clubs of the same or other National Federation(s).

League positions after playoffs of the previous season shown in parentheses. The Basketball Champions League rankings are taken into consideration.

- TH: Champions League title holders
- WC: Wild card.
- AV: Allocation vacant.^{NOTE}

NOTE: According to BCL rankings, National Federations of Bosnia and Herzegovina, Czechia and Hungary should had two berths in Regular season, as well as one berth for the champion of Romania (U-BT Cluj Napoca decided to play Eurocup), and one berth for the Russian representative (banned from competition). Their places were allocated to the teams from Turkey (3), Spain (1) and Poland (1).

Qualified teams for 2023–24 Basketball Champions League (by entry round)
Regular season
| (Turkey) Pınar Karşıyaka (2nd) | (Greece) AEK (6th)^{WC} | (France) JDA Dijon (5th) | (Czech Republic) Opava (1st) |
| (Turkey) Bursaspor İnfo Yatırım (5th) | (Spain) Unicaja (3rd) | (France) Le Mans Sarthe (6th) | (Hungary) Falco Szombathely (1st) |
| (Turkey) Darüşşafaka Lassa (6th)^{AV} | (Spain) Lenovo Tenerife (6th) | (Israel) Hapoel Jerusalem (3th) | (Latvia) VEF Rīga (1st) |
| (Turkey) Tofaş (7th)^{AV} | (Spain) UCAM Murcia (9th) | (Israel) Hapoel Holon (4th) | (Lithuania) Rytas (2nd) |
| (Turkey) Galatasaray Nef (8th)^{AV} | (Spain) Río Breogán (10th)^{AV} | (Italy) Bertram Derthona (3rd) | (Poland) King Szczecin (1st)^{AV} |
| (Greece) Peristeri bwin (3rd) | (Germany) Telekom Baskets Bonn (2nd)^{TH} | (Italy) Dinamo Sassari (4th) | |
| (Greece) PAOK (4th) | (Germany) MHP Riesen Ludwigsburg (4th) | (Belgium) Filou Oostende (1st) | |
| (Greece) Promitheas (5th)^{WC} | (Germany) EWE Baskets Oldenburg (6th) | (Bosnia and Herzegovina) Igokea (1st) | |
Qualifying rounds
| (France) Cholet (7th) | (Estonian Basketball Association) Kalev/Cramo (1st) | (Lithuanian Basketball Federation) CBet Jonava (4th) | (Slovakia) Patrioti Levice (1st) |
| (France) SIG Strasbourg (8th)^{WC} | (Basketball Finland) Karhu (2nd) | (Montenegro) Mornar Barsko zlato (3rd) | (Spanish Basketball Federation) Monbus Obradoiro (11th) |
| (Italian Basketball Federation) Happy Casa Brindisi (7th) | (Georgian Basketball Federation) TSU Tbilisi (1st) | (Netherlands) Heroes Den Bosch (3rd) | (Sweden) Norrköping Dolphins (1st) |
| (Italy) Openjobmetis Varese (13th)^{WC} | (German Basketball Federation) Göttingen (7th) | (Poland) Legia Warsaw (4th)^{WC} | (Switzerland) Fribourg Olympic (1st) |
| (Belgium) Telenet Giants Antwerp (2nd) | (United Kingdom) Caledonia Gladiators (4th) | (Portugal) Benfica (1st) | |
| (Cyprus Basketball Federation) AEK Larnaca (1st) | (Israel) Ironi Ness Ziona (6th) | (Romania) CSM Oradea (2nd) | |
| (Danish Basketball Association) Bakken Bears (1st) | (Kosovo) Peja (1st) | (Serbia) FMP Meridian (2nd) | |

Notes

1. Netherlands (NED): ZZ Leiden would have qualified as the winners of the 2022-23 BNXT Dutch Playoffs, but withdrew from applying because their arena did not meet FIBA Europe's capacity standards. As a result, the spot was given to Heroes Den Bosch, third in the national league.

== Qualifying rounds ==
=== Draw ===
The draw for the qualifying rounds will be made on 5 July 2023. The 25 teams were divided into six pots. The top eight national champions from the unrepresented nations were placed into Pots 1 and 2, and the remaining clubs into Pots 3–6. Pots are arranged based on the competition's club ranking and, for clubs that have not yet participated in the competition, on the country ranking.

The three winners of the finals will then qualify for the regular season and join the 29 directly qualified teams in the main draw. The rest of the teams will be demoted, if they apply, to the FIBA Europe Cup.

=== Venue ===
On July 27, 2023, it was announced that Antalya Sports Hall in Antalya, Turkey, has been selected as the host city for the Qualification Rounds which was scheduled to take place from 24 September to 1 October.

==== Champions Path ====
Pot 1
| Team | Pts |
|---|---|
| (Denmark) Bakken Bears | 24 |
| (Portugal) Benfica | 18 |
| (Estonian Basketball Association) Kalev/Cramo | 11 |
| (Slovakia) Patrioti Levice | 4 |

Pot 2
| Team | Pts |
|---|---|
| (Sweden) Norrköping Dolphins | 1 |
| (Cyprus Basketball Federation) AEK Larnaca | 1 |
| (Kosovo) Peja | 1.00^{†} |
| (Georgian Basketball Federation) TSU Tbilisi | 0.00^{†} |

==== Main Path ====
Pot 3
| Team | Pts |
|---|---|
| (France) SIG Strasbourg | 100 |
| (Italian Basketball Federation) Happy Casa Brindisi | 35 |
| (France) Cholet | 11 |
| (Poland) Legia Warszaw | 8 |

Pot 6
| Team | Pts |
|---|---|
| (Romania) CSM Oradea | 41.00^{†} |
| (Lithuanian Basketball Federation) CBet Jonava | 36.50^{†} |
| (Belgium) Telenet Giants Antwerp | 34.50^{†} |
Winner of the Preliminary round

Preliminary Pot
| Team | Pts |
|---|---|
| (United Kingdom) Caledonia Gladiators | 3.00^{†} |
| (Switzerland) Fribourg Olympic | 7 |

Pot 4
| Team | Pts |
|---|---|
| (Serbia) FMP Meridian | 4 |
| (Netherlands) Heroes Den Bosch | 2 |
| (Basketball Finland) Karhu | 2 |
| (Montenegro) Mornar Bar | 2 |

Pot 5
| Team | Pts |
|---|---|
| (Spanish Basketball Federation) Monbus Obradoiro | 102.25^{†} |
| (German Basketball Federation) Göttingen | 67.75^{†} |
| (Israel) Ironi Ness Ziona | 62.00^{†} |
| (Italy) Openjobmetis Varese | 41.33^{†} |

Notes

^† Indicates teams with no club points, therefore using the country points as a tiebreaker.

==== Pre-qualifier ====
The pre-qualifier round match consists of a one leg match that is expected to take place at a neutral venue.

The winner of the pre-qualifiers round match will be drawn to Pot 6 and advanced to the main qualifying rounds. The losers of the pre-qualifiers is transferred (if they apply) to the FIBA Europe Cup

| Team 1 | Score | Team 2 |
|---|---|---|
| Fribourg Olympic (Swiss Basketball) | 57–51 | (British Basketball) Caledonia Gladiators |

=== Qualification Group I ===
Quarter-finals
25 September
(Denmark) Bakken Bears | 103
(Kosovo) Peja | 79
25 September
(Estonia) Kalev | 78
(Sweden) Norrköping Dolphins | 82
25 September
(Portugal) Benfica | 122
(Georgia (country)) TSU Tbilisi | 62
25 September
(Slovakia) Patrioti Levice | 66
(Cyprus) AEK Larnaca | 74

Semi-finals
27 September
(Denmark) Bakken Bears | 68
(Sweden) Norrköping Dolphins | 78
27 September
(Portugal) Benfica | 87
(Cyprus) AEK Larnaca | 59

Final
29 September
(Sweden) Norrköping Dolphins | 73
(Portugal) Benfica | 83

=== Qualification Group II ===
Quarter-finals
27 September
(France) Cholet | 76
(Belgium) Antwerp Giants | 72
27 September
(Serbia) FMP | 71
(Italy) Varese | 73
27 September
(Italy) Brindisi | 77
(Romania) Oradea | 74
27 September
(Netherlands) Heroes Den Bosch | 96
(Germany) Göttingen | 84

Semi-finals
29 September
(France) Cholet | 96
(Italy) Varese | 88
29 September
(Italy) Brindisi | 78
(Netherlands) Heroes Den Bosch | 63

Final
1 October
(France) Cholet | 80
(Italy) Brindisi | 69

=== Qualification Group III ===
Quarter-finals
26 September
(France) SIG Strasbourg | 83
(Lithuania) Jonava | 78
26 September
(Finland) Karhu | 56
(Israel) Ironi Ness Ziona | 92
26 September
(Poland) Legia Warsaw | 70
(Switzerland) Fribourg Olympic | 59
26 September
(Montenegro) Mornar Bar | 56
(Spain) Obradoiro | 90

Semi-finals
28 September
(France) SIG Strasbourg | 79
(Israel) Ironi Ness Ziona | 74
28 September
(Poland) Legia Warsaw | 66
(Spain) Obradoiro | 74

Final
30 September
(France) SIG Strasbourg | 82
(Spain) Obradoiro | 78

== Regular season ==
Location of teams of the 2023–24 Basketball Champions League league phase

=== Draw ===
The 29 teams that entered in the regular season directly were divided into four pots based firstly on the club ranking and, for clubs that have not yet participated in the competition, on the country ranking. The country protection rule will apply for the stage of the draw. Clubs cannot be drawn in groups with other clubs from the same country.

Pot 1
| Team | Pts |
|---|---|
| (Spain) Lenovo Tenerife | 135 |
| (Israel) Hapoel Holon | 98 |
| (Israel) Hapoel Jerusalem | 78 |
| (Spain) Unicaja | 75 |
| (Turkey) Pınar Karşıyaka | 71 |
| (Turkey) Tofaş | 69 |
| (Greece) AEK | 67 |
| (France) JDA Dijon | 65 |

Pot 2
| Team | Pts |
|---|---|
| (Germany) MHP Riesen Ludwigsburg | 64 |
| (Lithuania) Rytas | 62 |
| (Turkey) Galatasaray Nef | 61 |
| (Germany) Telekom Baskets Bonn | 56 |
| (Bosnia and Herzegovina) Igokea | 56 |
| (Hungary) Falco Szombathely | 52 |
| (Turkey) Darüşşafaka Lassa | 52 |
| (Belgium) Filou Oostende | 49 |

Pot 3
| Team | Pts |
|---|---|
| (Italy) Dinamo Sassari | 40 |
| (Latvia) VEF Rīga | 38 |
| (Spain) UCAM Murcia | 33 |
| (Greece) Peristeri bwin | 30 |
| (Greece) PAOK | 26 |
| (Germany) EWE Baskets Oldenburg | 8 |
| (Turkey) Bursaspor İnfo Yatırım | 63.60^{†} |
| (Greece) Promitheas | 44.25^{†} |

Pot 4
| Team | Pts |
|---|---|
| (Czech Republic) Opava | 4 |
| (France) Le Mans Sarthe | 2 |
| (Spain) Río Breogán | 1 |
| (Italy) Bertram Derthona | 41.33^{†} |
| (Poland) King Szczecin | 19.00^{†} |
(Portugal) Benfica (Winner QF–T1)
(France) Cholet (Winner QF–T2)
(France) SIG Strasbourg (Winner QF–T3)

Notes

^† Indicates teams with no club points, therefore using the country points as a tiebreaker.

=== Group A ===
| Pos | Team | Pld | W | L | PF | PA | PD | Pts | Qualification | UNI | LMS | PER | FAL |
|---|---|---|---|---|---|---|---|---|---|---|---|---|---|
| 1 | (Spain) Unicaja | 6 | 4 | 2 | 490 | 442 | +48 | 10 | Advance to round of 16 | — | 83–74 | 81–64 | 88–65 |
| 2 | (France) Le Mans Sarthe | 6 | 3 | 3 | 477 | 463 | +14 | 9 | Advance to play-ins | 85–78 | — | 96–68 | 63–81 |
| 3 | (Greece) Peristeri bwin | 6 | 3 | 3 | 463 | 493 | −30 | 9 | Advance to play-ins | 76–73 | 78–86 | — | 87–70 |
| 4 | (Hungary) Falco Szombathely | 6 | 2 | 4 | 456 | 488 | −32 | 8 | | 78–87 | 75–73 | 87–90 | — |

Source: Groups standings
Legend: Blue = home team win; Red = away team win.

=== Group B ===
| Pos | Team | Pld | W | L | PF | PA | PD | Pts | Qualification | DIJ | RYT | PRO | OPA |
|---|---|---|---|---|---|---|---|---|---|---|---|---|---|
| 1 | (France) JDA Dijon | 6 | 5 | 1 | 526 | 441 | +85 | 11 | Advance to round of 16 | — | 87–83 | 88–80 | 99–64 |
| 2 | (Lithuania) Rytas | 6 | 4 | 2 | 509 | 455 | +54 | 10 | Advance to play-ins | 79–77 | — | 77–75 | 99–63 |
| 3 | (Greece) Promitheas | 6 | 3 | 3 | 516 | 475 | +41 | 9 | Advance to play-ins | 68–71 | 78–76 | — | 115–66 |
| 4 | (Czech Republic) Opava | 6 | 0 | 6 | 432 | 612 | −180 | 6 | | 67–104 | 75–95 | 97–100 | — |

Source: Groups standings
Legend: Blue = home team win; Red = away team win.

=== Group C ===
| Pos | Team | Pld | W | L | PF | PA | PD | Pts | Qualification | TFE | CHO | DAR | VEF |
|---|---|---|---|---|---|---|---|---|---|---|---|---|---|
| 1 | (Spain) Lenovo Tenerife | 6 | 4 | 2 | 490 | 443 | +47 | 10 | Advance to round of 16 | — | 95–75 | 72–63 | 76–55 |
| 2 | (France) Cholet | 6 | 3 | 3 | 485 | 495 | −10 | 9 | Advance to play-ins | 85–91 | — | 97–86 | 74–73 |
| 3 | (Turkey) Darüşşafaka Lassa | 6 | 3 | 3 | 488 | 500 | −12 | 9 | Advance to play-ins | 88–84 | 80–91 | — | 87–81 |
| 4 | (Latvia) VEF Rīga | 6 | 2 | 4 | 431 | 456 | −25 | 8 | | 77–72 | 70–63 | 75–84 | — |

Source: Groups standings
Legend: Blue = home team win; Red = away team win.

=== Group D ===
| Pos | Team | Pld | W | L | PF | PA | PD | Pts | Qualification | AEK | LUD | DIN | SZC |
|---|---|---|---|---|---|---|---|---|---|---|---|---|---|
| 1 | (Greece) AEK | 6 | 5 | 1 | 528 | 461 | +67 | 11 | Advance to round of 16 | — | 84–79 | 110–79 | 86–64 |
| 2 | (Germany) MHP Riesen Ludwigsburg | 6 | 3 | 3 | 480 | 490 | −10 | 9 | Advance to play-ins | 83–79 | — | 79–89 | 82–78 |
| 3 | (Italy) Dinamo Sassari | 6 | 2 | 4 | 509 | 543 | −34 | 8 | Advance to play-ins | 79–83 | 80–97 | — | 97–81 |
| 4 | (Poland) King Szczecin | 6 | 2 | 4 | 473 | 496 | −23 | 8 | | 77–86 | 80–60 | 93–85 | — |

Source: Groups standings
Legend: Blue = home team win; Red = away team win.

=== Group E ===
| Pos | Team | Pld | W | L | PF | PA | PD | Pts | Qualification | SIG | KAR | OOS | OLD |
|---|---|---|---|---|---|---|---|---|---|---|---|---|---|
| 1 | (France) SIG Strasbourg | 6 | 4 | 2 | 487 | 467 | +20 | 10 | Advance to round of 16 | — | 80–65 | 81–68 | 85–77 |
| 2 | (Turkey) Pınar Karşıyaka | 6 | 3 | 3 | 495 | 487 | +8 | 9 | Advance to play-ins | 87–72 | — | 94–77 | 85–83 |
| 3 | (Belgium) Filou Oostende | 6 | 3 | 3 | 462 | 499 | −37 | 9 | Advance to play-ins | 87–84 | 78–76 | — | 88–83 |
| 4 | (Germany) EWE Baskets Oldenburg | 6 | 2 | 4 | 504 | 495 | +9 | 8 | | 83–85 | 97–88 | 81–64 | — |

Source: Groups standings
Legend: Blue = home team win; Red = away team win.

=== Group F ===
| Pos | Team | Pld | W | L | PF | PA | PD | Pts | Qualification | BON | HOL | BRE | BUR |
|---|---|---|---|---|---|---|---|---|---|---|---|---|---|
| 1 | (Germany) Telekom Baskets Bonn | 6 | 3 | 3 | 497 | 473 | +24 | 9 | Advance to round of 16 | — | 74–75 | 86–71 | 82–92 |
| 2 | (Israel) Hapoel Holon | 6 | 3 | 3 | 463 | 456 | +7 | 9 | Advance to play-ins | 65–72 | — | 84–79 | 74–75 |
| 3 | (Spain) Rio Breogan | 6 | 3 | 3 | 462 | 459 | +3 | 9 | Advance to play-ins | 97–92 | 82–72 | — | 68–48 |
| 4 | (Turkey) Bursaspor İnfo Yatırım | 6 | 3 | 3 | 439 | 473 | −34 | 9 | | 73–91 | 74–93 | 77–65 | — |

Source: Groups standings
Legend: Blue = home team win; Red = away team win.

=== Group G ===
| Pos | Team | Pld | W | L | PF | PA | PD | Pts | Qualification | JER | PAO | GAL | BEN |
|---|---|---|---|---|---|---|---|---|---|---|---|---|---|
| 1 | (Israel) Hapoel Jerusalem | 6 | 5 | 1 | 513 | 440 | +73 | 11 | Advance to round of 16 | — | 71–61 | 99–96 | 97–68 |
| 2 | (Greece) PAOK | 6 | 3 | 3 | 455 | 478 | −23 | 9 | Advance to play-ins | 79–77 | — | 79–85 | 76–74 |
| 3 | (Turkey) Galatasaray Ekmas | 6 | 3 | 3 | 513 | 492 | +21 | 9 | Advance to play-ins | 70–85 | 77–88 | — | 98–78 |
| 4 | (Portugal) Benfica | 6 | 1 | 5 | 443 | 514 | −71 | 7 | | 66–84 | 94–72 | 63–87 | — |

Source: Groups standings
Legend: Blue = home team win; Red = away team win.

=== Group H ===
| Pos | Team | Pld | W | L | PF | PA | PD | Pts | Qualification | UCM | DER | TOF | IGO |
|---|---|---|---|---|---|---|---|---|---|---|---|---|---|
| 1 | (Spain) UCAM Murcia | 6 | 5 | 1 | 517 | 427 | +90 | 11 | Advance to round of 16 | — | 87–75 | 115–89 | 72–47 |
| 2 | (Italy) Bertram Derthona | 6 | 5 | 1 | 500 | 484 | +16 | 11 | Advance to play-ins | 78–74 | — | 91–85 | 91–84 |
| 3 | (Turkey) Tofaş | 6 | 2 | 4 | 532 | 551 | −19 | 8 | Advance to play-ins | 75–90 | 80–88 | — | 99–65 |
| 4 | (Bosnia and Herzegovina) Igokea | 6 | 0 | 6 | 435 | 522 | −87 | 6 | | 63–79 | 74–77 | 102–104 | — |

Source: Groups standings
Legend: Blue = home team win; Red = away team win.

== Play-ins ==
The Play-ins took place from 2 to 17 January 2024. The teams classified in second and third place in their respective groups of Basketball Champions League, went to the Play-ins. Winners advanced to the round of 16. The first legs were played on 2–3 January, the second legs on 9–10 January. Eventual third legs were played on 16–17 January.

| Team 1 | Series | Team 2 | Game 1 | Game 2 | Game 3 |
|---|---|---|---|---|---|
| Le Mans Sarthe (France) | 0–2 | (Greece) Promitheas | 68–78 | 78–91 | — |
| Rytas (Lithuania) | 0–2 | (Greece) Peristeri bwin | 92–110 | 80–83 | — |
| Cholet (France) | 2–1 | (Italy) Dinamo Sassari | 72–93 | 95–91 | 93–77 |
| MHP Riesen Ludwigsburg (Germany) | 2–1 | (Turkey) Darüşşafaka Lassa | 82–63 | 72–83 | 99–73 |
| Pınar Karşıyaka (Turkey) | 2–1 | (Spain) Río Breogán | 89–85 | 73–80 | 86–76 |
| Hapoel Holon (Israel) | 2–1 | (Belgium) Filou Oostende | 80–70 | 61–71 | 78–72 |
| PAOK (Greece) | 1–2 | (Turkey) Tofaş | 63–95 | 88–87 (OT) | 71–84 |
| Basket Derthona (Italy) | 0–2 | (Turkey) Galatasaray Ekmas | 70–71 | 89–95 | — |

== Round of 16 ==
The Round of 16 will take place from January 24 until March 22, 2024. The groups will be formed by the winners of each Regular Season Group and by eight Play-Ins winners. The 16 teams were divided in 4 groups, 4 teams each. The first two of each groups advanced to the quarter-finals.

=== Group I ===
| Pos | Team | Pld | W | L | PF | PA | PD | Pts | Qualification | UNI | TOF | SIG | CHO |
|---|---|---|---|---|---|---|---|---|---|---|---|---|---|
| 1 | (Spain) Unicaja | 6 | 6 | 0 | 510 | 422 | +88 | 12 | Advance to quarter-finals | — | 89–70 | 91–62 | 85–70 |
| 2 | (Turkey) Tofaş | 6 | 2 | 4 | 462 | 466 | −4 | 8 | Advance to quarter-finals | 76–80 | — | 93–71 | 84–71 |
| 3 | (France) SIG Strasbourg | 6 | 2 | 4 | 470 | 510 | −40 | 8 | | 70–79 | 78–65 | — | 96–84 |
| 4 | (France) Cholet | 6 | 2 | 4 | 474 | 518 | −44 | 8 | | 74–86 | 77–74 | 98–93 | — |

Source: Round of 16 Standings
Legend: Blue = home team win; Red = away team win.

=== Group J ===
| Pos | Team | Pld | W | L | PF | PA | PD | Pts | Qualification | BON | LUD | DIJ | GAL |
|---|---|---|---|---|---|---|---|---|---|---|---|---|---|
| 1 | (Germany) Telekom Baskets Bonn | 6 | 5 | 1 | 500 | 466 | +34 | 11 | Advance to quarter-finals | — | 80–75 | 89–74 | 89–76 |
| 2 | (Germany) MHP Riesen Ludwigsburg | 6 | 3 | 3 | 507 | 479 | +28 | 9 | Advance to quarter-finals | 81–85 | — | 71–59 | 100–80 |
| 3 | (France) JDA Dijon | 6 | 2 | 4 | 458 | 490 | −32 | 8 | | 62–72 | 82–89 | — | 85–76 |
| 4 | (Turkey) Galatasaray Ekmas | 6 | 2 | 4 | 516 | 546 | −30 | 8 | | 95–85 | 93–91 | 93–96 | — |

Source: Round of 16 Standings
Legend: Blue = home team win; Red = away team win.

=== Group K ===
| Pos | Team | Pld | W | L | PF | PA | PD | Pts | Qualification | TFE | PER | JER | KAR |
|---|---|---|---|---|---|---|---|---|---|---|---|---|---|
| 1 | (Spain) Lenovo Tenerife | 6 | 4 | 2 | 521 | 511 | +10 | 10 | Advance to quarter-finals | — | 89–68 | 95–92 | 88–79 |
| 2 | (Greece) Peristeri | 6 | 3 | 3 | 473 | 475 | −2 | 9 | Advance to quarter-finals | 90–82 | — | 75–77 | 76–73 |
| 3 | (Israel) Hapoel Jerusalem | 6 | 3 | 3 | 485 | 479 | +6 | 9 | | 85–61 | 61–76 | — | 83–74 |
| 4 | (Turkey) Pınar Karşıyaka | 6 | 2 | 4 | 514 | 528 | −14 | 8 | | 97–106 | 93–88 | 98–87 | — |

Source: Round of 16 Standings
Legend: Blue = home team win; Red = away team win.

=== Group L ===
| Pos | Team | Pld | W | L | PF | PA | PD | Pts | Qualification | UCM | PRO | HOL | AEK |
|---|---|---|---|---|---|---|---|---|---|---|---|---|---|
| 1 | (Spain) UCAM Murcia | 6 | 4 | 2 | 490 | 453 | +37 | 10 | Advance to quarter-finals | — | 90–81 | 78–61 | 100–89 |
| 2 | (Greece) Promitheas | 6 | 4 | 2 | 485 | 472 | +13 | 10 | Advance to quarter-finals | 79–78 | — | 92–93 | 80–79 |
| 3 | (Israel) Hapoel Holon | 6 | 4 | 2 | 474 | 480 | −6 | 10 | | 64–60 | 65–74 | — | 79–68 |
| 4 | (Greece) AEK | 6 | 0 | 6 | 490 | 534 | −44 | 6 | | 79–84 | 67–79 | 108–112 | — |

Source: Round of 16 Standings
Legend: Blue = home team win; Red = away team win.

== Playoffs ==
The playoffs will begin on 3 April 2024 and ends with the 2024 Basketball Champions League Final Four, which will be hosted in the Štark Arena in Belgrade, Serbia.

Quarterfinals
(Spain) Lenovo Tenerife | 83 | 81 | 78
(Turkey) Tofaş | 77 | 90 | 55
(Germany) Telekom Baskets Bonn | 89 | 62 | 77
(Greece) Peristeri | 78 | 90 | 89
(Spain) UCAM Murcia | 98 | 85 | —
(Germany) MHP Riesen Ludwigsburg | 72 | 72 | —
(Spain) Unicaja | 67 | 90 | —
(Greece) Promitheas | 54 | 83 | —

Semifinals
26 April
(Spain) Lenovo Tenerife | 97
(Greece) Peristeri | 93
26 April
(Spain) UCAM Murcia | 74
(Spain) Unicaja | 80

Final
28 April
(Spain) Lenovo Tenerife | 75
(Spain) Unicaja | 80
Third place
28 April
(Greece) Peristeri | 84
(Spain) UCAM Murcia | 87

== Final Four ==
=== Semifinals ===
The semifinals were played on 26 April 2024.

| Team 1 | Score | Team 2 |
|---|---|---|
| Lenovo Tenerife (Spain) | 97–93 | (Greece) Peristeri |
| UCAM Murcia (Spain) | 74–80 | (Spain) Unicaja |

=== Third place game ===
The third place game was played on 28 April 2024.

| Team 1 | Score | Team 2 |
|---|---|---|
| Peristeri (Greece) | 84–87 | (Spain) UCAM Murcia |

=== Final ===
The final was played on 28 April 2024.

| Team 1 | Score | Team 2 |
|---|---|---|
| Lenovo Tenerife (Spain) | 75–80 | (Spain) Unicaja |

== Individual awards ==
=== Season awards ===
The annual season awards were announced on 27 April.

| Award | Player | Club |
|---|---|---|
| Most Valuable Player | (Brazil) Marcelo Huertas | (Spain) Lenovo Tenerife |
| Final Four MVP | (Montenegro) Kendrick Perry | (Spain) Unicaja |
| Defensive Player of the Year | (Cuba) Howard Sant-Roos | (Spain) UCAM Murcia |
| Best Young Player | (France) Tidjane Salaün | (France) Cholet |
| Best Coach | (Greece) Vassilis Spanoulis | (Greece) Peristeri |

==== Star Lineup ====
| First Team | | Second Team | |
| Player | Team | Player | Team |
|---|---|---|---|
| (United States) (Liberia) Joe Ragland | (Greece) Peristeri | (Jamaica) Dylan Ennis | (Spain) UCAM Murcia |
| (Brazil) Marcelinho Huertas | (Spain) Lenovo Tenerife | (United States) Hunter Hale | (Greece) Promitheas Patras |
| (Montenegro) Kendrick Perry | (Spain) Unicaja | (United States) Levi Randolph | (Israel) Hapoel Jerusalem |
| (United States) David Kravish | (Spain) Unicaja | (United States) Dylan Osetkowski | (Spain) Unicaja |
| (United States) Austin Wiley | (Turkey) Tofaş | (United States) Vernon Carey Jr. | (Turkey) Pınar Karşıyaka |

=== MVP of the Month ===
| Month | Player | Club | Ref. |
2023
| October | (United States) Vernon Carey Jr. | (Turkey) Pınar Karşıyaka | |
| November | (United States) Justin Tillman | (Greece) AEK | |
| December | (United States) Levi Randolph | (Israel) Hapoel Jerusalem | |
2024
| January | (United States) Hunter Hale | (Greece) Promitheas Patras | |
| March | (United States) (Liberia) Joe Ragland | (Greece) Peristeri | |

=== Team of the Month ===
| Year | Month | Player | Team | Ref. |
|---|---|---|---|---|
| 2023 | October | (United States) Chris Dowe | (Italy) Derthona Basket | |
| 2023 | October | (United States) Justin Tillman | (Greece) AEK | |
| 2023 | October | (Slovenia) Gregor Hrovat | (France) JDA Dijon | |
| 2023 | October | (United States) David McCormack | (Turkey) Darüşşafaka Lassa | |
| 2023 | October | (United States) Vernon Carey Jr. | (Turkey) Pınar Karşıyaka | |
| 2023 | November | (Brazil) Marcelinho Huertas | (Spain) Lenovo Tenerife | |
| 2023 | November | (United States) David Holston | (France) JDA Dijon | |
| 2023 | November | (United States) Kendall Smith | (Greece) PAOK | |
| 2023 | November | (United States) Levi Randolph | (Israel) Hapoel Jerusalem | |
| 2023 | November | (United States) Justin Tillman | (Greece) AEK | |
| 2023 | December | (United States) Muhammad-Ali Abdur-Rahkman | (Turkey) Darüşşafaka Lassa | |
| 2023 | December | (United States) Levi Randolph (x2) | (Israel) Hapoel Jerusalem | |
| 2023 | December | (Belgium) Pierre-Antoine Gillet | (Belgium) Filou Oostende | |
| 2023 | December | (Lithuania) Gytis Radzevičius | (Lithuania) Rytas Vilnius | |
| 2023 | December | (United States) David McCormack (x2) | (Turkey) Galatasaray Ekmas | |
| 2024 | January | (Brazil) Marcelinho Huertas | (Spain) Lenovo Tenerife | |
| 2024 | January | (United States) Hunter Hale | (Greece) Promitheas Patras | |
| 2024 | January | (United States) Craig Randall II | (France) Cholet Basket | |
| 2024 | January | (United States) Justin Smith | (Israel) Hapoel Holon | |
| 2024 | January | (United States) Austin Wiley | (Turkey) Tofaş | |
| 2024 | March | (United States) (Liberia) Joe Ragland | (Greece) Peristeri | |
| 2024 | March | (Brazil) Marcelinho Huertas (x2) | (Spain) Lenovo Tenerife | |
| 2024 | March | (United States) Jayvon Graves | (Germany) Riesen Ludwigsburg | |
| 2024 | March | (United States) Dustin Sleva | (Spain) UCAM Murcia | |
| 2024 | March | (Colombia) Jaime Echenique | (Greece) Promitheas Patras | |

== See also ==
- 2023–24 EuroLeague
- 2023–24 EuroCup Basketball
- 2023–24 FIBA Europe Cup
