= 2024 Basketball Champions League Final Four =

Basketball tournament in Belgrade, Serbia

- Season: 2023–24 season

Tournament details
- Arena: Belgrade Arena; Belgrade, Serbia
- Dates: 26–28 April 2024

Final positions
- Champions: (Spain) Unicaja (1st title)
- Runners-up: (Spain) Lenovo Tenerife
- Third place: (Spain) UCAM Murcia
- Fourth place: (Greece) Peristeri

Awards and statistics
- MVP: Kendrick Perry (Unicaja)

The 2024 Basketball Champions League Final Four, also known as the 2024 BCL Final Four, is the concluding tournament of the 2023–24 Basketball Champions League. The tournament was hosted at the Belgrade Arena in Belgrade, Serbia.

== Teams ==
Unicaja qualified for a second consecutive Final Four appearance. UCAM Murcia returned to the Final Four after a 6-year absence. Lenovo Tenerife will play their record-extending sixth Final Four, and their sixth in eight years. Peristeri will make their Final Four debut and become the second Greek team to qualify (after AEK Athens).

Three teams from Spain qualified for the Final Four, which is the first time in the league's history that it features teams from the same country.

Team	Qualified on	Previous final tournament appearances (Note: Both Final Four and Final Eight tournaments.)
(Spain) UCAM Murcia	9 April 2024	1 (2018)
(Spain) Unicaja	9 April 2024	1 (2023)
(Greece) Peristeri	16 April 2024	0
(Spain) Lenovo Tenerife	17 April 2024	6 (2017, 2019, 2020, 2021, 2022, 2023)

== Venue and floor ==
On 21 March 2024, FIBA Europe revelead the Belgrade Arena in Belgrade, Serbia, as the venue for the Final Four at a ceremony in Mies, Switzerland. It is the first time the league's final four is hosted in Serbia, and the second time a neutral venue is selected (following Bilbao in 2022). Željko Rebrača was named ambassador for the Final Four.

The games will be played on a glass floor equipped with LED panels, provided by ASB GlassFloor. It will be the first time this type of floor is used in an international basketball club competition game.

== Bracket ==
Semifinals
26 April
(Spain) Lenovo Tenerife	97
(Greece) Peristeri	93
26 April
(Spain) UCAM Murcia	74
(Spain) Unicaja	80

Final
28 April
(Spain) Lenovo Tenerife	75
(Spain) Unicaja	80
Third place game
28 April
(Greece) Peristeri	84
(Spain) UCAM Murcia	87

== Semifinals ==
In the first semifinal, Kyle Guy of Lenovo Tenerife set a new Final Four record for most points in a game with 34 points.

26 April 2024	Lenovo Tenerife (Spain)	97–93	(Greece) Peristeri	Belgrade
18:00	Scoring by quarter: 19–23, 24–19, 23–18, 31–33
	Pts: Guy 34; Rebs: Huertas 9 Asts: Huertas 7 Eff: Huertas 32	Boxscore	Pts: Mitrou-Long 18; Rebs: Dangubić 5 Asts: Mitrou-Long 6 Eff: Mitrou-Long 19	Arena: Belgrade Arena; Referees: Ademir Zurapović (BIH), Manuel Mazzoni (ITA), Boris Krejic (SVN)

26 April 2024	UCAM Murcia (Spain)	74–80	(Spain) Unicaja	Belgrade
21:00	Scoring by quarter: 26–15, 14–18, 15–26, 19–21
	Pts: Todorović 18; Rebs: Birgander, Todorović 5 Asts: Ennis 5 Eff: Todorović 23	Boxscore	Pts: Carter 14; Rebs: Đedović, Osetkowski 5 Asts: Díaz 6 Eff: Kravish 15	Arena: Belgrade Arena; Referees: Yohan Rosso (FRA), Wojciech Liszka (POL), Gatis Saliņš (LVA)

== Third place game ==
28 April 2024	Peristeri (Greece)	84–87	(Spain) UCAM Murcia	Belgrade
17:00	Scoring by quarter: 23–27, 12–17, 20–19, 29–24
	Pts: Ragland 24; Rebs: Renfro 6 Asts: Ragland 8 Eff: Ragland 28	Boxscore	Pts: Håkanson 22; Rebs: Sleva 5 Asts: Caupain 4 Eff: Håkanson 23	Arena: Belgrade Arena; Referees: Martins Kozlovskis (LVA), Gatis Saliņš (LVA), Kerem Baki (TUR)

== Final ==
It was the second time in league history that the final was contested by two Spanish teams, and the fifth time in all European competitions. Tenerife's Marcelo Huertas was named league MVP at age 40 one day before the final. Unicaja forced Lenovo Tenerife to commit 19 turnovers on their way to the 80–75 win. Kendrick Perry won the Final Four MVP award after scoring a team-high 17 points in 20 minutes off the bench.

28 April 2024	Lenovo Tenerife (Spain)	75–80	(Spain) Unicaja	Belgrade
20:00	Scoring by quarter: 10–16, 17–22, 29–24, 19–18
	Pts: Guy 18; Rebs: Abromaitis 7 Asts: Huertas 9 Eff: Shermadini 23	Boxscore	Pts: Perry 17; Rebs: Kravish 5 Asts: Díaz 5 Eff: Perry 16	Arena: Belgrade Arena; Attendance: 5,237; Referees: Yohan Rosso (FRA), Manuel Mazzoni (ITA), Wojciech Liszka (POL)
