= David Kravish =

American basketball player

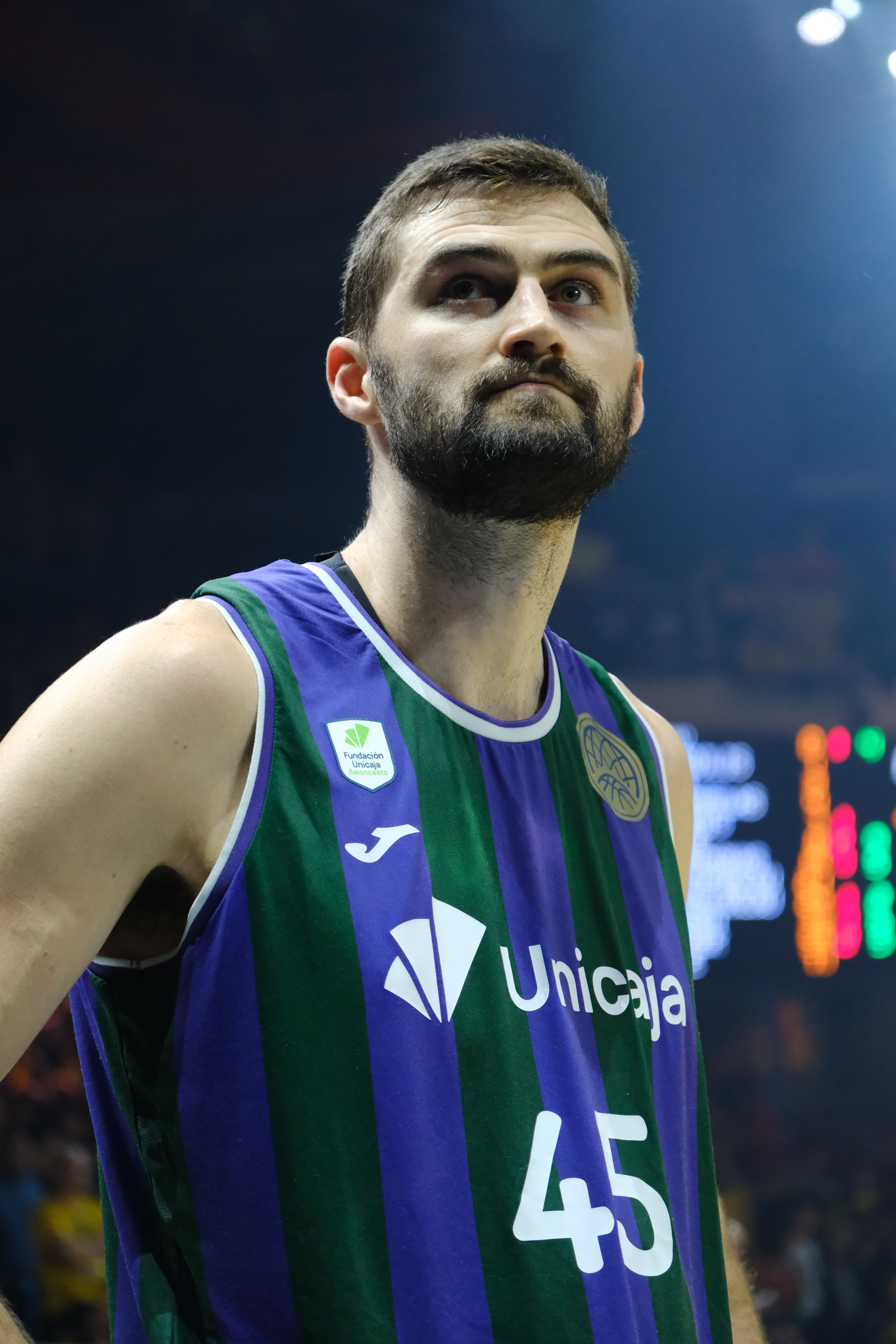
- Kravish with Unicaja in 2025

No. 45 – Unicaja Málaga
- Position: Center
- League: Liga ACB

Personal information
- Born: September 12, 1992 (age 34) Joliet, Illinois, U.S.
- Listed height: 6 ft 10 in (2.08 m)
- Listed weight: 240 lb (109 kg)

Career information
- High school: Lee's Summit North (Lee's Summit, Missouri)
- College: California (2011–2015)
- NBA draft: 2015: undrafted
- Playing career: 2015–present

Career history
- 2015–2016: BC Nokia
- 2016–2017: Czarni Słupsk
- 2017–2018: BC Tsmoki-Minsk
- 2018–2019: BC Avtodor
- 2019–2020: Baxi Manresa
- 2020–2021: Brose Bamberg
- 2021–2022: Galatasaray Nef
- 2022–present: Unicaja Málaga

Career highlights
- 2× FIBA Intercontinental Cup champion (2024, 2025); 2× Basketball Champions League champion (2024, 2025); All-FIBA Champions League First Team (2024); BBL Most Effective Player (2021); BBL rebounding leader (2021)

David Jeffrey Kravish (born September 12, 1992) is an American-born naturalized Bulgarian professional basketball player for Unicaja Málaga of the Liga ACB. He played college basketball for California. Standing at 2.08 m (6 ft 10 in), he plays at the center position.

== College career ==
Kravish played for seasons with the California Golden Bears. He became a starter for the team during his freshman season, appearing in all 34 of California's games with 24 starts and averaging 6.9 points and 5.6 rebounds per game while leading the team with 41 blocked shots (1.2 per game). Kravish was named to the Pac-12 Conference All-Freshman Team. As a sophomore, he averaged 7.9 points, 6.9 rebounds and 1.7 blocks per game. In his junior season, Kravish averaged 11.4 points, 7.7 rebounds and 2.1 blocks per game and set a school record with 73 blocked shots which has since passed by Kingsley Okoroh. He averaged 11.3 points, 7.0 rebounds and 1.5 blocks per game as a senior.

== Professional career ==
=== Nokia ===
Kravish began his professional career playing for BC Nokia in the Finnish Korisliiga, where he averaged 13.7 points and 7.7 rebounds per game in 47 games as the team finished in third place.

=== Słupsk ===
Kravish signed with Czarni Słupsk of the Polish Basketball League (PLK) on July 31, 2016. In 41 games, Kravish averaged 12.9 points, 8.0 rebounds, 1.1 assists and 1.3 blocks per game.

=== Minsk ===
Kravish signed with the Belarusan club BC Tsmoki-Minsk of the VTB United League. He averaged 12.1 points, 7.5 rebounds, 1.3 assists and 1.3 blocks per game in VTB United League play. He also averaged 10.3 points, 7.2 rebounds, 1.6 assists and 1.5 blocks in 14 FIBA Europe Cup games and 9.7 points and 8.7 rebounds in six Champions League games.

=== Avtodor ===
Kravish remained in the United League for a second season, signing with the Russian club BC Avtodor on June 21, 2018. He averaged 12.3 points, 7.9 rebounds, 1.2 assists and 1.1 block in United League play and was twice named the player of the week. In 13 Europe Cup games Kravish averaged 10.2 points per game and 7.8 rebounds per game, highest in the competition.

=== Manresa ===
Kravish signed with Baxi Manresa of the Liga ACB on August 4, 2019. He averaged 11.5 points and 6.1 rebounds per game.

=== Brose Bamberg ===
On August 4, 2020, Kravish signed with Brose Bamberg of the German Basketball Bundesliga (BBL).

=== Galatasaray ===
On August 12, 2021, Kravish signed with Galatasaray Nef of the Turkish Basketball Super League (BSL).

=== Unicaja ===
On June 23, 2022, he has signed with Unicaja of the Liga ACB.

In September 2025, Kravish signed a contract extension with the team for three more seasons.

== National team career ==
He has received Bulgarian citizenship and represents the Bulgarian national team.
