= Dustin Sleva =

American basketball player (born 1995)

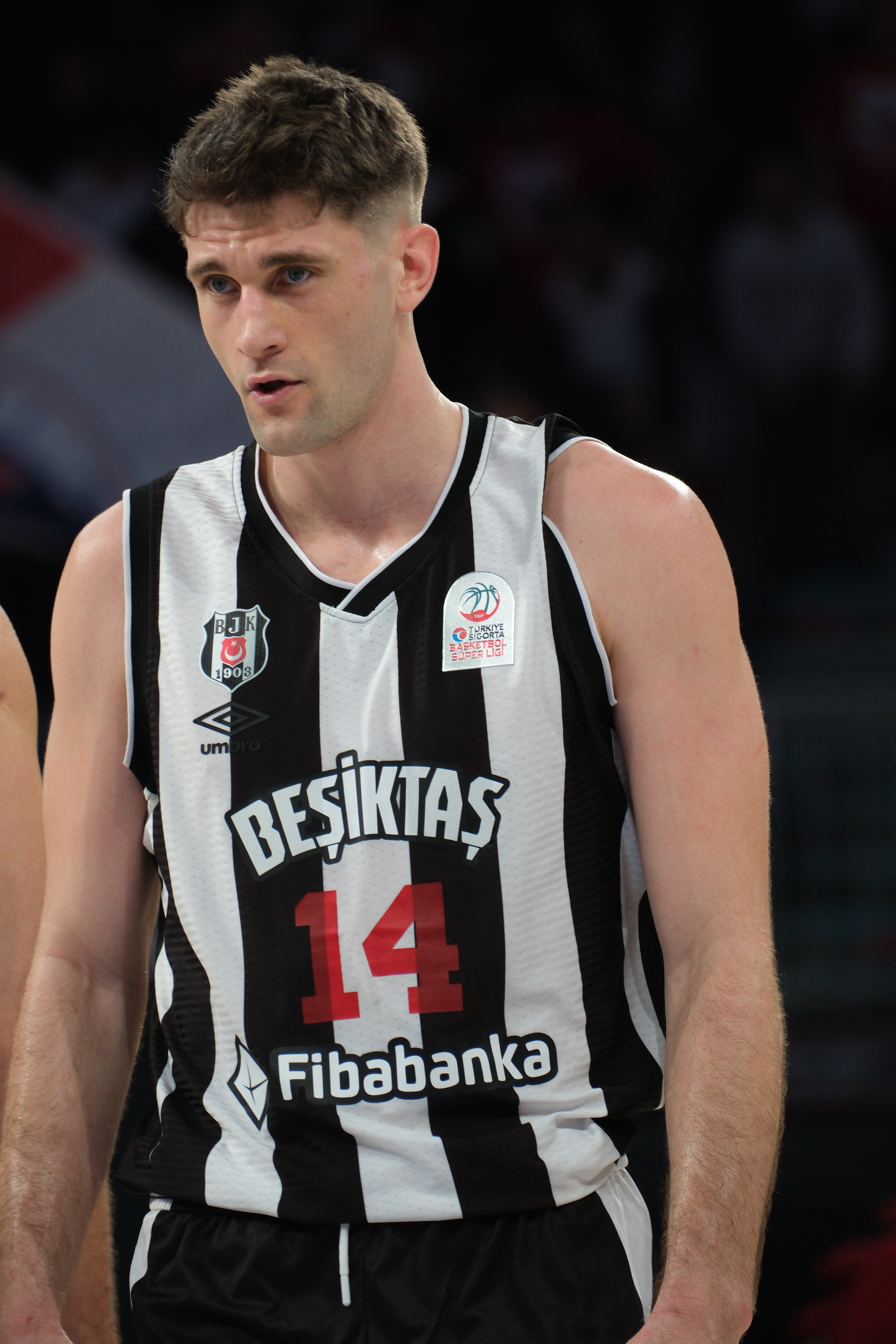
- Sleva with Beşiktaş in 2025

No. 14 – Žalgiris Kaunas
- Position: Power forward / center
- League: LKL; EuroLeague

Personal information
- Born: September 23, 1995 (age 31) Pittsburgh, Pennsylvania, U.S.
- Listed height: 6 ft 8 in (2.03 m)
- Listed weight: 224 lb (102 kg)

Career information
- High school: Montour (Robinson, Pennsylvania)
- College: Shippensburg (2014–2018)
- NBA draft: 2018: undrafted
- Playing career: 2018–present

Career history
- 2018–2023: Paris Basketball
- 2023: Braunschweig
- 2023–2024: UCAM Murcia
- 2024–2025: Beşiktaş
- 2025–present: Žalgiris Kaunas

Career highlights
- LKL winner (2026); King Mindaugas Cup winner (2026); EuroCup steals leader (2025); 2× Division II All-American – NABC (2017, 2018); 2× PSAC East Player of the Year (2017, 2018); 3× First-team All-PSAC East (2016–2018)

Dustin Nathaniel Sleva (born September 23, 1995) is an American professional basketball player for Žalgiris Kaunas of the Lithuanian Basketball League (LKL) and the EuroLeague. He played college basketball for the Shippensburg Raiders.

== Professional career ==
=== Paris Basketball (2018–2023) ===
On August 16, 2018, he signed with Paris Basketball of the LNB Pro B.

=== Braunschweig (2023) ===
On January 6, 2023, he signed with Braunschweig of the Basketball Bundesliga (BBL).

=== UCAM Murcia (2023–2024) ===
On July 25, 2023, he signed with UCAM Murcia of the Liga ACB. With Sleva on the team Murcia reached the finals of the 2024 ACB Playoffs, but was swept 0-3 by Real Madrid.

=== Beşiktaş (2024–2025) ===
On February 1, 2025, he signed with Beşiktaş of the Basketbol Süper Ligi (BSL).

=== Žalgiris (2025–present) ===
On June 27, 2025, Sleva signed with Žalgiris Kaunas in the LKL and the EuroLeague. On April 4, 2026, Sleva signed a contract extension with Žalgiris through the 2027–28 season, including a potential buyout clause in 2027. Reflecting on the extension, Sleva noted that after an initial period of adaptation in the EuroLeague, he found his rhythm and embraced the local basketball culture, describing the sport in Kaunas as a "religion".

== Career statistics ==
Legend
GP	Games played	GS	Games started	MPG	Minutes per game
FG%	Field-goal percentage	3P%	3-point field-goal percentage	FT%	Free-throw percentage
RPG	Rebounds per game	APG	Assists per game	SPG	Steals per game
BPG	Blocks per game	PPG	Points per game	PIR	Performance index rating
**Bold**	Career high

=== EuroLeague ===
Year	Team	GP	GS	MPG	FG%	3P%	FT%	RPG	APG	SPG	BPG	PPG	PIR
2025–26	Žalgiris	34	7	18.2	.459	.420	.735	3.4	1.1	.6	.1	7.1	6.5
Career		34	7	18.2	.459	.420	.735	3.4	1.1	.6	.1	7.1	6.5

=== EuroCup ===
Year	Team	GP	GS	MPG	FG%	3P%	FT%	RPG	APG	SPG	BPG	PPG	PIR
2022–23	Paris Basketball	8	0	17.0	**.541**	.364	**1**	3.1	1.0	.3	**.4**	6.4	7.0
2024–25	Beşiktaş	**19**	**17**	**23.2**	.511	**.400**	.778	**3.5**	**1.1**	**1.8**	.1	**10.3**	**10.9**
Career		27	17	21.4	.518	.393	.803	3.4	1.0	1.4	.1	9.1	9.7

=== College ===
Year	Team	GP	GS	MPG	FG%	3P%	FT%	RPG	APG	SPG	BPG	PPG
2013–14	Shippensburg Raiders	27	27	27.4	.540	.403	.814	4.6	2.6	.8	.5	8.7
2014–15	Shippensburg Raiders	29	28	31.1	.500	.392	.775	**11.0**	2.1	.5	.4	15.8
2015–16	Shippensburg Raiders	31	31	32.6	**.540**	**.407**	.808	7.7	**3.4**	.9	.8	**21.7**
2016–17	Shippensburg Raiders	**33**	**33**	**34.2**	.508	.374	**.824**	10.8	3.0	**.9**	**1.2**	21.4
Career		120	119	31.5	.520	.392	.806	8.7	2.8	.8	.8	17.3

== Personal life ==
Two of Sleva's great-great-grandparents hailed from Kaunas, Lithuania and in 2026 he considered applying for the Lithuanian citizenship.

While playing in Lithuania, Sleva started dating Francesca Frericks, an American football player, playing for MFA Žalgiris-MRU in Vilnius.
