= 2024 EuroLeague Playoffs =

European basketball postseason play

The 2024 EuroLeague Playoffs, known as the 2024 Turkish Airlines EuroLeague Playoffs for sponsorship purposes, were the second postseason portion of the 2023–24 EuroLeague basketball competition. They began on 23 April 2024 and were played through 8 May 2024. The top six finishers in the regular season qualified for the playoffs directly, while the teams placed from seventh to tenth battled for the remaining two seeds in a play-in tournament. The playoffs consist of four series of two teams each, to be played in a best-of-five format. The winners of each of the playoffs series advanced to the Final Four, which will determine the EuroLeague champion for the 2023–24 season.

== Qualified teams ==
Pos	Team	Pld	W	L	PF	PA	PD	Qualification
1	(Spanish Basketball Federation) Real Madrid	34	27	7	2924	2681	+243	Qualification to playoffs
2	(Hellenic Basketball Federation) Panathinaikos AKTOR	34	23	11	2752	2580	+172	Qualification to playoffs
3	(French Federation of Basketball) AS Monaco	34	23	11	2770	2671	+99	Qualification to playoffs
4	(Spanish Basketball Federation) Barcelona	34	22	12	2812	2692	+120	Qualification to playoffs
5	(Hellenic Basketball Federation) Olympiacos	34	22	12	2658	2538	+120	Qualification to playoffs
6	(Turkish Basketball Federation) Fenerbahçe Beko	34	20	14	2855	2723	+132	Qualification to playoffs
7	(Israeli Basketball Association) Maccabi Playtika Tel Aviv	34	20	14	2969	2939	+30	Qualification to play-in
8	(Spanish Basketball Federation) Baskonia	34	18	16	2849	2867	−18	Qualification to play-in
9	(Turkish Basketball Federation) Anadolu Efes	34	17	17	2871	2855	+16	Qualification to play-in
10	(Italian Basketball Federation) Virtus Segafredo Bologna	34	17	17	2728	2804	−76	Qualification to play-in

Source: EuroLeague
Rules for classification: All points scored in extra period(s) were not counted in the standings, nor for any tie-break situation.

=== Tiebreakers ===
When more than two teams are tied, the ranking will be established taking into account the victories obtained in the games played only among them. Should the tie persist among some, but not all, of the teams, the ranking of the teams still tied will be determined by again taking into account the victories in the games played only among them, and repeating this same procedure until the tie is entirely resolved. If a tie persists, the ranking will be determined by the goal difference in favour and against in the games played only among the teams still tied.

== Play-in ==
Under the new format, the 7th to 10th-ranked teams faced each other in the play-in. Each game is hosted by the team with the higher regular season record. The format was similar to the first two rounds of the Page–McIntyre system for a four-team playoff that was identical to that of the NBA play-in tournament. First, the 7th seed hosted the 8th seed, with the winner advancing to the playoffs; likewise the 9th seed hosted the 10th seed, with the loser eliminated. Then the loser of the 7-v-8 game hosted the winner of the 9-v-10 game, with the winner of that game getting the final playoff spot.

Round 1
Play-In A
7	(Israel) Maccabi Playtika Tel Aviv	113
8	(Spain) Baskonia	85
Play-In B
9	(Turkey) Anadolu Efes	64
10	(Italy) Virtus Segafredo Bologna	67

Round 2
Play-In C
8	(Spain) Baskonia	89
10	(Italy) Virtus Segafredo Bologna	77

=== Matches ===
16 April 2024 Play-in A	Maccabi Playtika Tel Aviv (Israeli Basketball Association)	113–85	(Spanish Basketball Federation) Baskonia	Belgrade (Note: From 24 October onwards through the end of the season, Maccabi Playtika Tel Aviv played their home matches in Belgrade due to the inability to host matches in Israel as a result of the Gaza war.)
19:00 (CEST)	Scoring by quarter: 28–15, 27–21, 31–25, 27–24
	Pts: Brown 29; Rebs: Nebo 7 Asts: Blatt 7 PIR: Brown 35	Boxscore	Pts: Miller-McIntyre 32; Rebs: Miller-McIntyre 8 Asts: Miller-McIntyre 7 PIR: Miller-McIntyre 45	Arena: Belgrade Arena; Attendance: 400; Referees: Fernando Rocha, Matej Boltauzer, Robert Lottermoser

16 April 2024 Play-in B	Anadolu Efes (Turkish Basketball Federation)	64–67	(Italian Basketball Federation) Virtus Segafredo Bologna	Istanbul
20:00 (CEST)	Scoring by quarter: 23–21, 13–14, 14–13, 14–19
	Pts: Clyburn 22; Rebs: Jones 7 Asts: Hollatz, Larkin 2 PIR: Clyburn 19	Boxscore	Pts: Shengelia 13; Rebs: Lundberg 7 Asts: Lundberg 7 PIR: Lundberg 16	Arena: Sinan Erdem Dome; Attendance: 14,967; Referees: Sreten Radović, Carlos Peruga, Uroš Nikolić

19 April 2024 Play-in C	Baskonia (Spanish Basketball Federation)	89–77	(Italian Basketball Federation) Virtus Segafredo Bologna	Vitoria-Gasteiz
20:30 (CEST)	Scoring by quarter: 21–22, 20–19, 31–16, 17–20
	Pts: Howard 28; Rebs: three players 7 Asts: Miller-McIntyre 8 PIR: Sedekerskis 25	Boxscore	Pts: Shengelia 16; Rebs: Shengelia 7 Asts: Cordinier 4 PIR: Shengelia, Hackett 18	Arena: Buesa Arena; Attendance: 10,143; Referees: Ilija Belošević, Mehdi Difallah, Milan Nedović

== Playoff series ==
Playoff series were best-of-five. The first team to win three games wins the series. A 2–2–1 format was used – teams with home-court advantage played games 1, 2, and 5 at home, while their opponents hosted games 3 and 4. Games 4 and 5 were only played if necessary. The four winning teams advanced to the Final Four.

Team 1	Series	Team 2	Game 1	Game 2	Game 3	Game 4	Game 5
Real Madrid (Spanish Basketball Federation)	3–0	(Spanish Basketball Federation) Baskonia	90–74	101–90	102–98	—	—
Panathinaikos AKTOR (Hellenic Basketball Federation)	3–2	(Israeli Basketball Association) Maccabi Playtika Tel Aviv	87–91	95–79	83–85	95–88	81–72
AS Monaco (French Federation of Basketball)	2–3	(Turkish Basketball Federation) Fenerbahçe Beko	91–95	93–88	78–89	65–62	79–80
Barcelona (Spanish Basketball Federation)	2–3	(Hellenic Basketball Federation) Olympiacos	75–77	77–69	82–80	58–92	59–63

=== Real Madrid vs. Baskonia ===
23 April 2024 Game 1	Real Madrid (Spanish Basketball Federation)	90–74 (Series: 1–0)	(Spanish Basketball Federation) Baskonia	Madrid
21:00 (CEST)	Scoring by quarter: 26–17, 22–20, 22–16, 20–21
	Pts: Musa 16; Rebs: three players 7 Asts: Rodríguez 6 PIR: Musa 20	Boxscore	Pts: Howard 15; Rebs: Sedekerskis 7 Asts: Miller-McIntyre 5 PIR: Costello 17	Arena: WiZink Center; Attendance: 9,632; Referees: Emin Moğulkoç, Oļegs Latiševs, Ioannis Foufis

25 April 2024 Game 2	Real Madrid (Spanish Basketball Federation)	101–90 (Series: 2–0)	(Spanish Basketball Federation) Baskonia	Madrid
21:00 (CEST)	Scoring by quarter: 23–21, 23–19, 28–23, 27–27
	Pts: Campazzo 24; Rebs: Tavares 9 Asts: Campazzo 7 PIR: Campazzo 33	Boxscore	Pts: Marinković 20; Rebs: Miller-McIntyre, Sedekerskis 6 Asts: Miller-McIntyre 8 PIR: Marinković 24	Arena: WiZink Center; Attendance: 10,688; Referees: Fernando Rocha, Saša Pukl, Jakub Zamojski

1 May 2024 Game 3	Baskonia (Spanish Basketball Federation)	98–102 (Series: 0–3)	(Spanish Basketball Federation) Real Madrid	Vitoria-Gasteiz
20:30 (CEST)	Scoring by quarter: 22–22, 34–30, 17–20, 25–30
	Pts: Howard 29; Rebs: Miller-McIntyre 7 Asts: Miller-McIntyre 11; PIR: Miller-McIntyre 25	Boxscore	Pts: Yabusele 23; Rebs: Tavares 13; Asts: Rodríguez 9 PIR: three players 26	Arena: Buesa Arena; Attendance: 13,440; Referees: Robert Lottermoser, Uroš Nikolić, Piotr Pastusiak

=== Panathinaikos AKTOR vs. Maccabi Playtika Tel Aviv ===
23 April 2024 Game 1	Panathinaikos AKTOR (Hellenic Basketball Federation)	87–91 (Series: 0–1)	(Israeli Basketball Association) Maccabi Playtika Tel Aviv	Marousi
19:30 (CEST)	Scoring by quarter: 25–26, 25–16, 20–21, 17–28
	Pts: Lessort 22; Rebs: Hernangómez 9 Asts: Sloukas 13; PIR: Lessort 26	Boxscore	Pts: Colson 18; Rebs: Nebo 8 Asts: Baldwin 7 PIR: Nebo, Baldwin 18	Arena: OAKA Altion; Attendance: 18,541; Referees: Matej Boltauzer, Juan Carlos García, Miloš Koljenšić

25 April 2024 Game 2	Panathinaikos AKTOR (Hellenic Basketball Federation)	95–79 (Series: 1–1)	(Israeli Basketball Association) Maccabi Playtika Tel Aviv	Marousi
20:15 (CEST)	Scoring by quarter: 20–28, 31–11, 20–21, 24–19
	Pts: Sloukas 29; Rebs: Lessort 8 Asts: Sloukas 4 PIR: Sloukas 28	Boxscore	Pts: Brown 18; Rebs: Webb 5 Asts: Brown, Blatt 6 PIR: Brown 21	Arena: OAKA Altion; Attendance: 18,080; Referees: Ilija Belošević, Carlos Peruga, Milivoje Jovčić

30 April 2024 Game 3	Maccabi Playtika Tel Aviv (Israeli Basketball Association)	85–83 (Series: 2–1)	(Hellenic Basketball Federation) Panathinaikos AKTOR	Belgrade
19:00 (CEST)	Scoring by quarter: 23–11, 23–26, 21–19, 18–27
	Pts: Nebo 22; Rebs: Nebo 9 Asts: Brown 8 PIR: Nebo 31	Boxscore	Pts: Nunn 25; Rebs: Lessort, Papapetrou 6 Asts: Lessort 5 PIR: Lessort 31	Arena: Aleksandar Nikolić Hall; Attendance: 1,000; Referees: Sreten Radović, Emin Moğulkoç, Luka Kardum

2 May 2024 Game 4	Maccabi Playtika Tel Aviv (Israeli Basketball Association)	88–95 (Series: 2–2)	(Hellenic Basketball Federation) Panathinaikos AKTOR	Belgrade
20:45 (CEST)	Scoring by quarter: 29–26, 21–23, 19–25, 19–21
	Pts: Brown 17; Rebs: Colson 6 Asts: Blatt 7 PIR: Brown, Blatt 19	Boxscore	Pts: Nunn 27; Rebs: Sloukas 8 Asts: Sloukas 6 PIR: Sloukas 32	Arena: Aleksandar Nikolić Hall; Attendance: 1,000; Referees: Ilija Belošević, Mehdi Difallah, Milan Nedović

7 May 2024 Game 5	Panathinaikos AKTOR (Hellenic Basketball Federation)	81–72 (Series: 3–2)	(Israeli Basketball Association) Maccabi Playtika Tel Aviv	Marousi
20:15 (CEST)	Scoring by quarter: 19–21, 22–20, 17–15, 23–16
	Pts: Nunn 26; Rebs: Lessort 11; Asts: Grant, Nunn 4 PIR: Nunn 27	Boxscore	Pts: Brown 19; Rebs: Nebo 7 Asts: Brown 7 PIR: Brown 24	Arena: OAKA Altion; Attendance: 18,310; Referees: Ilija Belošević, Emin Moğulkoç, Mehdi Difallah

=== AS Monaco vs. Fenerbahçe Beko ===
24 April 2024 Game 1	AS Monaco (French Federation of Basketball)	91–95(OT) (Series: 0–1)	(Turkish Basketball Federation) Fenerbahçe Beko	Fontvieille
19:00 (CEST)	Scoring by quarter: 26–15, 20–22, 15–23, 20–21, Overtime: 10–14
	Pts: Okobo 19; Rebs: Blossomgame 9 Asts: James, Okobo 4 PIR: three players 17	Boxscore	Pts: Hayes-Davis 19; Rebs: Hayes-Davis, Dorsey 7 Asts: Gudurić, Dorsey 5 PIR: Hayes-Davis 23	Arena: Salle Gaston Médecin; Attendance: 4,529; Referees: Miguel Ángel Pérez, Piotr Pastusiak, Artūras Šukys

26 April 2024 Game 2	AS Monaco (French Federation of Basketball)	93–88 (Series: 1–1)	(Turkish Basketball Federation) Fenerbahçe Beko	Fontvieille
19:00 (CEST)	Scoring by quarter: 31–21, 23–29, 11–24, 28–14
	Pts: Motiejūnas 18; Rebs: James 7 Asts: James 7 PIR: Motiejūnas 21	Boxscore	Pts: Dorsey 25; Rebs: Hayes-Davis, Papagiannis 6 Asts: Calathes 7 PIR: Dorsey 20	Arena: Salle Gaston Médecin; Attendance: 4,891; Referees: Robert Lottermoser, Gytis Vilius, Jordi Aliaga

1 May 2024 Game 3	Fenerbahçe Beko (Turkish Basketball Federation)	89–78 (Series: 2–1)	(French Federation of Basketball) AS Monaco	Istanbul
19:45 (CEST)	Scoring by quarter: 19–21, 28–19, 22–18, 20–20
	Pts: Biberović 14; Rebs: Papagiannis 6 Asts: Gudurić 6 PIR: Calathes 18	Boxscore	Pts: Diallo 23; Rebs: Diallo 7 Asts: James 7 PIR: Diallo 28	Arena: Ülker Sports and Event Hall; Attendance: 12,680; Referees: Fernando Rocha, Damir Javor, Emilio Pérez

3 May 2024 Game 4	Fenerbahçe Beko (Turkish Basketball Federation)	62–65 (Series: 2–2)	(French Federation of Basketball) AS Monaco	Istanbul
19:45 (CEST)	Scoring by quarter: 15–11, 18–19, 14–18, 15–17
	Pts: Gudurić 14; Rebs: Papagiannis 11; Asts: Calathes 5 PIR: Papagiannis 20	Boxscore	Pts: Okobo 13; Rebs: Hall 7 Asts: James, Loyd 3 PIR: Hall 13	Arena: Ülker Sports and Event Hall; Attendance: 12,673; Referees: Miguel Ángel Pérez, Carlos Peruga, Uroš Nikolić

8 May 2024 Game 5	AS Monaco (French Federation of Basketball)	79–80(OT) (Series: 2–3)	(Turkish Basketball Federation) Fenerbahçe Beko	Fontvieille
19:00 (CEST)	Scoring by quarter: 15–13, 25–22, 15–21, 15–14, Overtime: 9–10
	Pts: James 20; Rebs: Motiejūnas 7 Asts: Okobo 5 PIR: James 20	Boxscore	Pts: Calathes, Wilbekin 14; Rebs: Calathes 6 Asts: Calathes, Hayes-Davis 4 PIR: Biberović 17	Arena: Salle Gaston Médecin; Attendance: 4,839; Referees: Fernando Rocha, Carlos Peruga, Emilio Pérez

=== Barcelona vs. Olympiacos ===
24 April 2024 Game 1	Barcelona (Spanish Basketball Federation)	75–77 (Series: 0–1)	(Hellenic Basketball Federation) Olympiacos	Barcelona
21:00 (CEST)	Scoring by quarter: 18–19, 17–25, 19–17, 21–16
	Pts: Hernangómez, Parker 13; Rebs: Parker 7 Asts: Rubio 7 PIR: Hernangómez, Rubio 14	Boxscore	Pts: Williams-Goss 15; Rebs: Petrušev 5 Asts: Walkup 5 PIR: Petrušev 16	Arena: Palau Blaugrana; Attendance: 7,328; Referees: Damir Javor, Tomislav Hordov, Rain Peerandi

26 April 2024 Game 2	Barcelona (Spanish Basketball Federation)	77–69 (Series: 1–1)	(Hellenic Basketball Federation) Olympiacos	Barcelona
21:00 (CEST)	Scoring by quarter: 27–14, 16–23, 17–20, 17–12
	Pts: Parker 24; Rebs: Veselý 7 Asts: Rubio 6 PIR: Parker 22	Boxscore	Pts: Peters 20; Rebs: Sikma 6 Asts: Walkup 7 PIR: Peters 19	Arena: Palau Blaugrana; Attendance: 7,692; Referees: Sreten Radović, Carmelo Paternicò, Uroš Nikolić

30 April 2024 Game 3	Olympiacos (Hellenic Basketball Federation)	80–82(OT) (Series: 1–2)	(Spanish Basketball Federation) Barcelona	Piraeus
20:30 (CEST)	Scoring by quarter: 13–13, 24–19, 14–25, 20–14, Overtime: 9–11
	Pts: Petrušev 18; Rebs: Wright 8 Asts: Walkup 6 PIR: Wright 24	Boxscore	Pts: Veselý 16; Rebs: Parker 9 Asts: Laprovíttola 8 PIR: Satoranský 20	Arena: Peace and Friendship Stadium; Attendance: 12,240; Referees: Ilija Belošević, Mehdi Difallah, Milan Nedović

2 May 2024 Game 4	Olympiacos (Hellenic Basketball Federation)	92–58 (Series: 2–2)	(Spanish Basketball Federation) Barcelona	Piraeus
18:45 (CEST)	Scoring by quarter: 21–23, 32–14, 19–10, 20–11
	Pts: McKissic 21; Rebs: Milutinov 11; Asts: Williams-Goss 4 PIR: McKissic 28	Boxscore	Pts: Parker 10; Rebs: da Silva 7 Asts: Brizuela 3 PIR: Veselý 12	Arena: Peace and Friendship Stadium; Attendance: 12,240; Referees: Sreten Radović, Saša Pukl, Tomislav Hordov

8 May 2024 Game 5	Barcelona (Spanish Basketball Federation)	59–63 (Series: 2–3)	(Hellenic Basketball Federation) Olympiacos	Barcelona
21:00 (CEST)	Scoring by quarter: 12–9, 15–16, 13–15, 19–23
	Pts: Laprovíttola 17; Rebs: Satoranský 8 Asts: Satoranský 5 PIR: Laprovíttola, Satoranský 18	Boxscore	Pts: McKissic 12; Rebs: Milutinov 10; Asts: Williams-Goss 4 PIR: Milutinov 26	Arena: Palau Blaugrana; Attendance: 7,742; Referees: Sreten Radović, Damir Javor, Uroš Nikolić
