= Ergin Ataman =

Turkish basketball coach (born 1966)

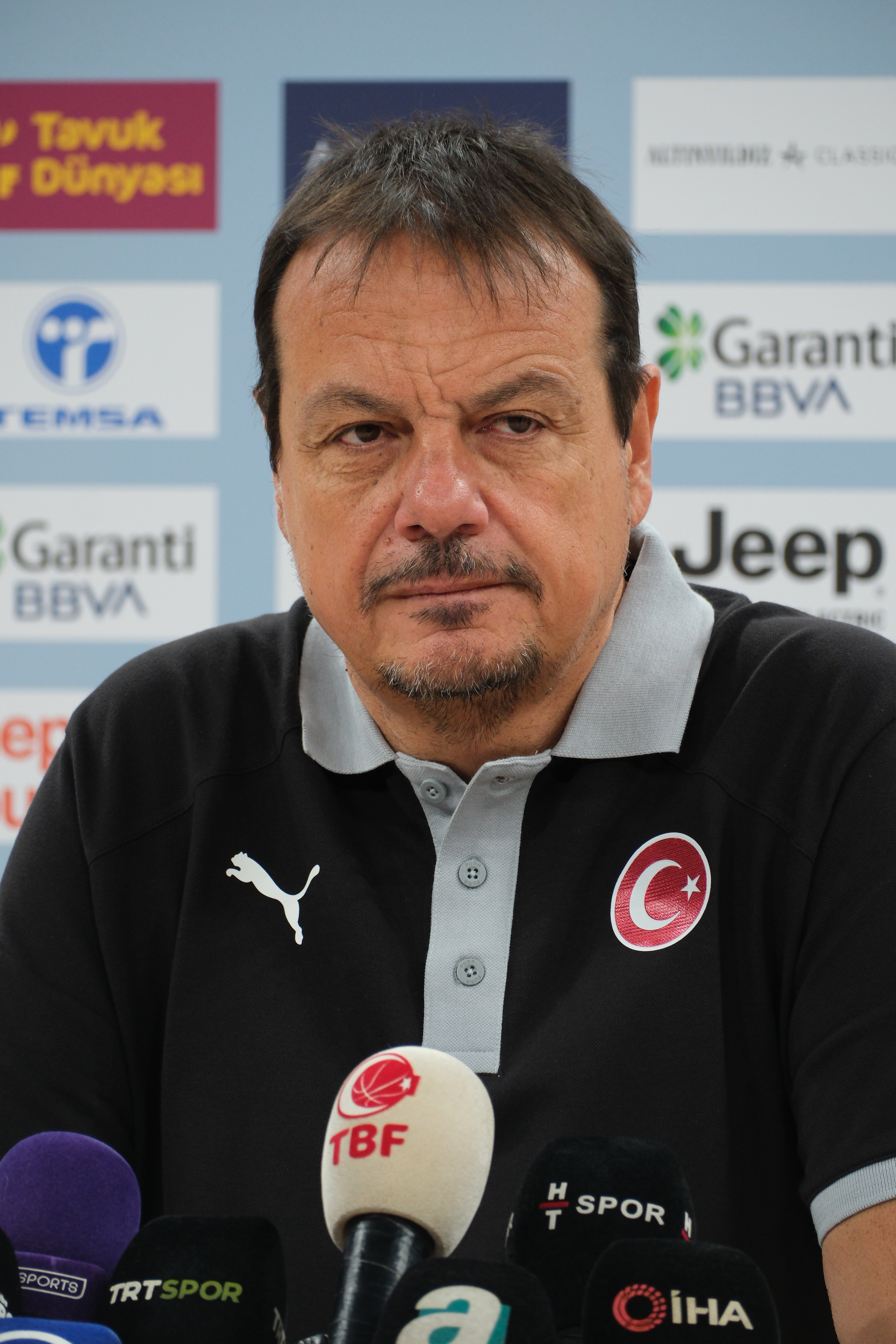
- Ataman in February 2025

Turkey
- Position: Head coach

Personal information
- Born: January 7, 1966 (age 60) Istanbul, Turkey

Career information
- Playing career: 1984–1992
- Coaching career: 1992–present

Career history

Coaching
- 1992–1996: Efes Pilsen (assistant)
- 1996–1998: Türk Telekom
- 1999: Pınar Karşıyaka
- 1999–2001: Efes Pilsen
- 2001–2003: Montepaschi Siena
- 2003–2006: Ülker
- 2006–2007: Climamio Bologna
- 2007–2008: Beşiktaş
- 2008–2010: Efes Pilsen
- 2011–2012: Beşiktaş
- 2012–2017: Galatasaray
- 2014–2016: Turkey
- 2017–2023: Anadolu Efes
- 2022–present: Turkey
- 2023–2026: Panathinaikos

Career highlights
- As head coach: 3× EuroLeague champion (2021, 2022, 2024); EuroCup champion (2016); FIBA Saporta Cup champion (2002); FIBA EuroChallenge champion (2012); Greek League champion (2024); 2× Greek Cup winner (2025, 2026); 6× Turkish Super League champion (2009, 2012, 2013, 2019, 2021, 2023); 6× Turkish Cup winner (2004, 2005, 2009, 2012, 2018, 2022); 7× Turkish Super Cup winner (2000, 2004, 2005, 2009, 2018, 2019, 2022); EuroLeague Coach of the Year (2021); Greek League Coach of the Year (2024); As assistant coach: FIBA Korać Cup champion (1996)
Medals
Men's basketball
Head coach for Turkey
EuroBasket
Silver medal – second place	2025 Cyprus–Finland–Poland–Latvia

Halil Ergin Ataman (born January 7, 1966) is a Turkish professional basketball coach, currently serving as the head coach of the Turkish national team. Ataman is considered the most successful coach in Turkish basketball history, and one of the most successful coaches in Europe, having won three EuroLeague titles in 2021, 2022 and 2024. In 2021 and 2022 he won back to back EuroLeague titles with Anadolu Efes and in 2024 he won the EuroLeague title with Panathinaikos in his first year.

During his playing career which began in 1982, he played for Eczacıbaşı and Yeşilyurt, both clubs are amateur in the Turkish basketball scene.

== Coaching career ==
=== Early years ===
Ataman began his managerial career in Eczacıbaşı Youth Team followed by a stint as the coach of Efes Pilsen Youth Team. Then, he coached the BSL teams Türk Telekom, Pınar Karşıyaka and Efes Pilsen respectively. He was the assistant coach of Turkish national team alongside Ercüment Sunter in EuroBasket 1997 in Spain. Turkey finished the tournament in the 8th place. He spent time at Stanford University in the United States as an observer during the 1998-99 season.

After his return to Europe, he coached the Italian side, Montepaschi Siena, and with the club won the final Saporta Cup in 2002. Subsequently, he joined Ülker; however, he had to quit his job due to personal issues. He stated that his resignation was voluntary. Subsequent to his departure from Ülker he returned to Italy and signed for Climamio Bologna and coached there until his return to Turkey as the head coach of Beşiktaş during the 2007–08 season.

=== Beşiktaş Cola Turka ===
Ataman had a successful season with Beşiktaş which the team achieved EuroCup Quarter Finals held in Turin, Italy; after a stunning undefeated 10 in-a-row win performance in group B. This was the very first time that two Turkish teams played against each other. Beşiktaş lost against Galatasaray Cafe Crown and eliminated in quarters. In the league, team finalized the regular season on top place and been a part of Play-offs. After the elimination of Beşiktaş Cola Turka in the quarters, the declaration was released that Ergin Ataman would stop coaching Beşiktaş Cola Turka.

=== Efes Pilsen ===
A week later, he signed a two-year contract with Efes Pilsen, where he had worked from 1999 to 2001. Ataman has reached major achievements in the 2008–09 season by winning Turkish League, Turkish Cup, and Turkish President's Cup championships. On June 4, 2010, he left the Efes Pilsen.

=== Return to Beşiktaş ===
He signed a two-years contract with Beşiktaş in the January 2011. In the 2010–11 season, he didn't win the cups with Beşiktaş. And next season, he won the Turkish Cup in February 2012. Subsequently, he won the EuroChallenge title against Élan Chalon in the final on April 29, 2012. And finally, he won the Turkish League championship victory against Anadolu Efes in the playoff finals on June 11, 2012.

=== Galatasaray Odeabank ===
He signed a multi-year contract with Galatasaray Odeabank on June 22, 2012. He won the Turkish League championship victory against Banvitspor in the playoff finals on June 15, 2013.

In the beginning of 2014–15 season, Galatasaray struggled financially and eventually in the results. Several players boycotted training and also some were injured, which led to frustration and conflicts in the team. On October 19, 2014, Ataman was involved in the incident with then-Galatasaray player Nolan Smith, who threw the towel while being subbed out from the game against Banvit. The player parted ways with the team the following week. After a EuroLeague game against Crvena zvezda on November 21, 2014, Ataman came under fire for calling the Delije "terrorists", stating that they were "attacking police and fans with torches and stones" and that he was "worried as a citizen for his and others safety". All these comments came in line with the killing of Crvena zvezda fan by Galatasaray supporters in fan violence before the game. Even Serbian PM Aleksandar Vučić reacted to that comment, saying that "Ataman is no longer welcome in Serbia". Ataman later apologized for his comments, saying that "all the remarks [on Zvezda fans] were made before learning it [that this tragedy occurred before the game]".

On June 6, 2015, he signed a two-year extension with the club, reportedly worth half million euros per season.

On April 27, Ataman's team Galatasaray Odebank defeated Strasbourg in Abdi İpekçi Arena and won the EuroCup title. With this win he reached his 3rd European-wide championship as a head coach.

=== Anadolu Efes ===
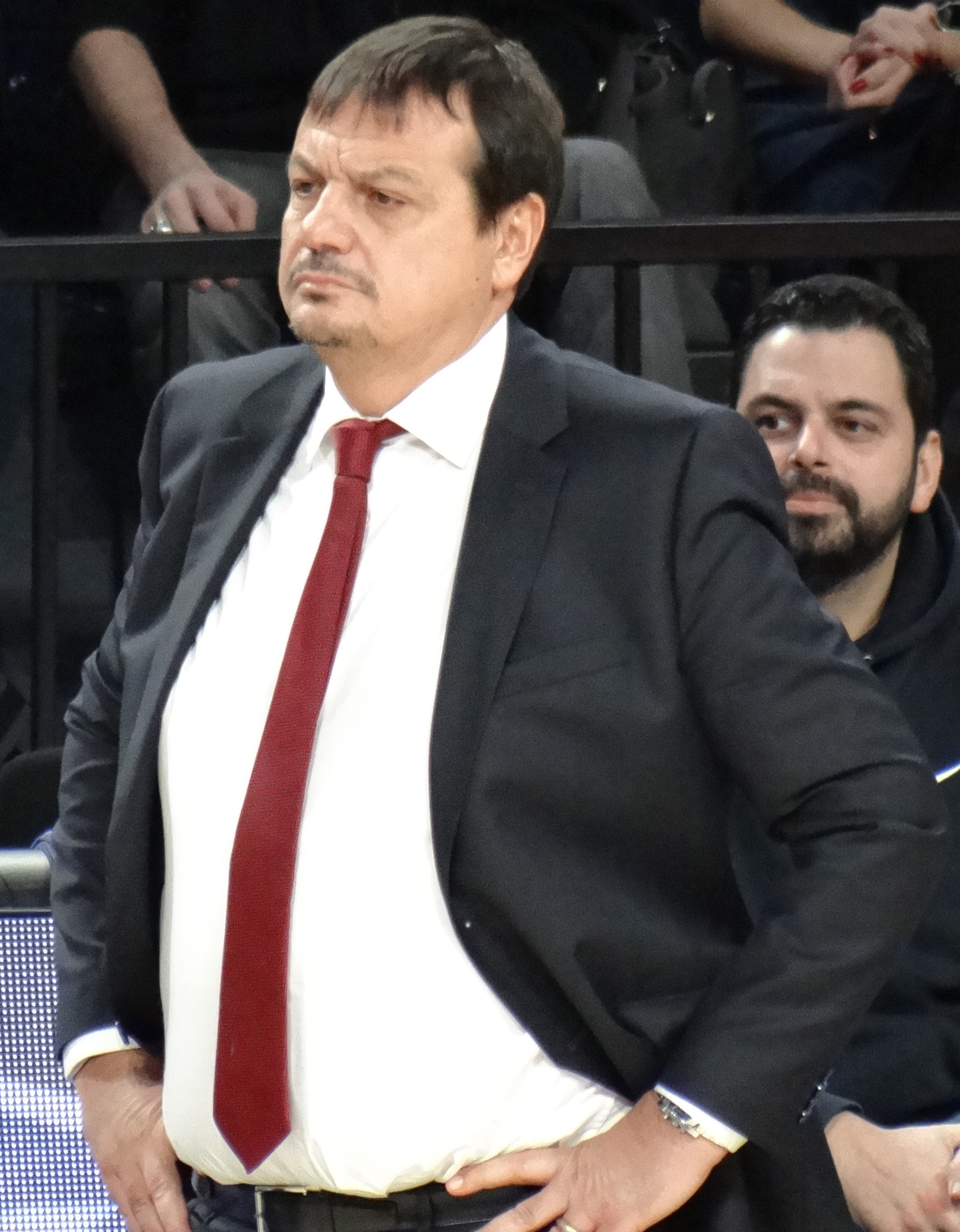
Ataman in January 2018

In December 2017, Ataman signed a contract with Anadolu Efes.

In the 2018–19 season, Ataman led Anadolu Efes to the 2019 EuroLeague Final Four, where they lost in the final game to the CSKA Moscow. On May 23, Ataman signed a two-year contract extension with the Anadolu Efes.

In the 2020–21 season, Ataman won the EuroLeague title where they played with Barcelona in the final game. Ataman became the first Turkish coach who won the EuroLeague title. And next season, he won the Turkish Cup in February 2022.

He won the EuroLeague title for the second time in a row in the final match against Real Madrid in the 2021–22 season.

=== Panathinaikos ===
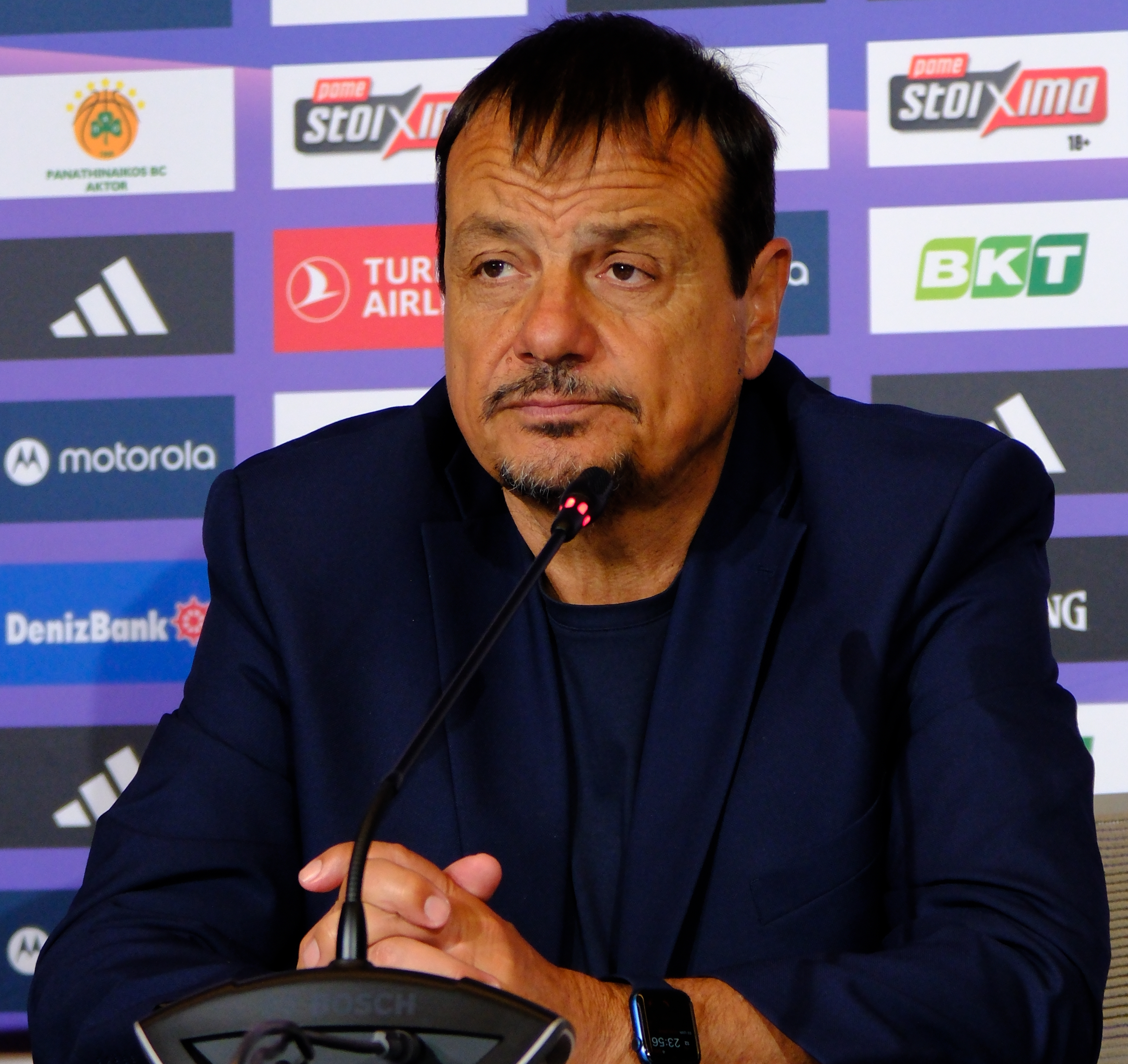
Ataman with Panathinaikos in 2025

On April 21, 2023, Ataman signed a two-year contract with Greek Basket League and EuroLeague powerhouse Panathinaikos, marking a new page in his career. The deal was made official on June 20, 2023.

On 17 November 2023 against Virtus Bologna, he reached 200 career wins in the EuroLeague.

In the 2023-24 season, Ataman and Panathinaikos finished in the 2nd place in the Euroleague Regular Season (23W-11L) and secured the home court advantage for the Playoffs, where they eliminated Maccabi Tel Aviv with a score of 3-2 and led Panathinaikos to the Final Four in Berlin for the first time after an absence of twelve years.

He won Panathinaikos' seventh EuroLeague title and the first one since 2011, facing Real Madrid in the final where the "Greens" dominated the second half against Real Madrid for an 80-95 victory in Berlin and managed to win the Euroleague title in his first season as the head coach.

On July 23, 2024, Ataman officially renewed his contract with the reigning EuroLeague champions through 2027.

On September 24, 2024 at the end of friendly match between Panathinaikos and Galatasaray Ataman rose his hand gesturing the score 3-1, which was the result in the last football derby score between Fenerbahce and Galatasaray. This gesture led Fenerbahce to announce it will not send players to the national team as long as he is on the bench.

On February 16, 2025, Panathinaikos won the Greek Cup, beating their archrival Olympiacos in the Final.

=== National team ===
Ataman was appointed head coach of the Turkish national team on 25 March 2014. Ataman's leadership of the national team resulted in a second-place finish in the group stage of the 2014 FIBA Basketball World Cup, with the United States taking the top spot. In the Round of 16, Turkey narrowly secured a victory over Australia but were subsequently eliminated by Lithuania in the quarterfinals.

At the EuroBasket 2015, Turkey with Ataman attained fourth position in their group, achieving a tie with Spain and Italy in terms of points, closely behind Serbia. Then, the team was defeated by France with a score of 76–53 in the quarter-finals. In the end of tournament, Ataman announced his resignation from the national team on 31 August 2016.

On 16 April 2022, Ataman resumed his position as head coach of the Turkish national basketball team. In his second term in this post, his team has achieved a second-place finish in the group stage of the EuroBasket 2022, closely following Spain. In the last 16, they were defeated by France with a score of 87–86 in overtime. Ataman said that "I don’t know what to say really. I’m so mad. I’m so sad. I can’t find any nice words. Sorry about it. I don’t remember a game like this" after match, in the press conference.

In the 2024 FIBA Olympic Qualifying Tournament, after successful group and qualifying stages, they lost to Croatia with a score of 84-71 in the final, on 20 August 2023, resulting in their inability to qualify for the Olympic Games.

Under the leadership of Coach Ataman, Turkey successfully secured a spot in the EuroBasket 2025 after the Pre-Qualifying group matches. In this tournament, Turkey achieved an undefeated record until progressing to the final. The team, which reached the final for the second time in European Basketball Championship history since 2001, lost to Germany and finished second, winning the silver medal. Ataman was awarded the title of best coach at the tournament. Despite winning silver medal, he expressed his disappointment for the result and said that "the silver medal after so many years is, of course, a great achievement. The Turkish nation is proud of these guys. However, I am deeply saddened."

== Coaching record ==
Legend
G	Games coached	W	Games won	L	Games lost	W–L %	Win-loss %

Note: The EuroLeague is not the only competition in which the team played during the season. He also coached in domestic competition, and regional competition if applicable.

=== EuroLeague ===
Team	Year	G	W	L	W–L%	Result
Montepaschi	2002–03	22	11	11	.500	Won in 3rd place game
Ülker	2003–04	13	6	7	.462	Eliminated in Top 16 stage
Ülker	2004–05	22	10	12	.455	Eliminated in quarterfinals
Ülker	2005–06	19	6	13	.316	Eliminated in Top 16 stage
Bologna	2006–07	14	5	9	.357	Eliminated in regular season
Efes Pilsen	2008–09	10	4	6	.400	Eliminated in regular season
Efes Pilsen	2009–10	16	6	10	.375	Eliminated in Top 16 stage
Galatasaray	2013–14	27	13	14	.481	Eliminated in quarterfinals
Galatasaray	2014–15	24	6	18	.250	Eliminated in Top 16 stage
Galatasaray	2016–17	30	11	19	.367	Eliminated in regular season
Anadolu Efes	2017–18	18	4	14	.222	Eliminated in regular season
Anadolu Efes	2018–19	37	24	13	.649	Lost in the final game
Anadolu Efes	2019–20	28	24	4	.857	Season cancelled due to the COVID-19 pandemic
Anadolu Efes	2020–21	41	27	14	.659	Won EuroLeague Championship
Anadolu Efes	2021–22	34	21	13	.618	Won EuroLeague Championship
Anadolu Efes	2022–23	34	17	17	.500	Eliminated in regular season
Panathinaikos	2023–24	41	28	13	.683	Won EuroLeague Championship
Panathinaikos	2024–25	41	25	16	.610	Lost in 3rd place game
Career		471	248	223	.527	

=== Domestic Leagues ===
Team	Year	G	W	L	W–L%	Result
Anadolu Efes	2017–18	36	25	11	.694	Lost 2018 Turkish League Semifinals
Anadolu Efes	2018–19	40	34	6	.850	Won 2019 Turkish League Finals
Anadolu Efes	2019–20	23	21	2	.913	Season cancelled due to the COVID-19 pandemic
Anadolu Efes	2020–21	38	37	1	.974	Won 2021 Turkish League Finals
Anadolu Efes	2021–22	42	29	13	.690	Lost 2022 Turkish League Finals
Anadolu Efes	2022–23	39	30	9	.769	Won 2023 Turkish League Finals
Career		218	176	42	.807	

== Achievements ==
- Türk Telekom 1
  - Turkish President's Cup: (1997)
- Montepaschi Siena 1
  - Saporta Cup: (2002)
  - EuroLeague Final Four: (2003)
- Ülker 4
  - Turkish Cup:(2004, 2005)
  - Turkish President's Cup: (2004, 2005)
- Anadolu Efes 15
  - Korać Cup (1996) Assistant Coach
  - EuroLeague: (2021, 2022)
  - EuroLeague Final Four: (2000), (2019)
  - Turkish Super League: (2009, 2019, 2021, 2023)
  - Turkish President's Cup: (2000, 2009, 2018, 2019, 2022)
  - Turkish Cup: (2009, 2018, 2022)
- Beşiktaş 3
  - Turkish Cup: (2012)
  - EuroChallenge: (2012)
  - Turkish Super League: (2012)
- Galatasaray 2
  - Turkish Super League: (2013)
  - EuroCup: (2016)
- Panathinaikos 4
  - EuroLeague: (2024)
  - EuroLeague Final Four: (2025)
  - Greek League: (2024)
  - Greek Cup: (2025), (2026)

== Personal life ==
Ataman graduated from Italian High School in Istanbul. Then he was accepted by Istanbul University, where he studied at Business Administration Department. He is married to Berna Ataman and has a son named Sarp. In addition to his native Turkish, Ataman also speaks Italian and English.

Ataman is a fan and member of Galatasaray and enjoys a high status among their fans. The fans of Galatasaray call him “İmparator” because of his leadership style and aura, which means “Emperor” in Turkish.

From 2020 to 2021, Ataman was a shareholder of Basket Torino, a team competing in the Italian Serie A2 Basket.

== See also ==
- List of EuroLeague-winning head coaches
