= 2023–24 EuroLeague =

European basketball competition

2023–24 Turkish Airlines EuroLeague^{1}
- Season: 2023–24
- Duration: 5 October 2023 – 12 April 2024 (Regular season); 16 April 2024 – 19 April 2024 (Play-in tournament); 23 April 2024 – 8 May 2024 (Playoffs); 24 May 2024 – 26 May 2024 (Final Four)
- Games played: 327
- Teams: 18

Regular season
- Top seed: (Spain) Real Madrid
- Season MVP: (United States) Mike James

Final Four
- Champions: (Greece) Panathinaikos (7th title)
- Runners-up: (Spain) Real Madrid
- Third place: (Greece) Olympiacos
- Fourth place: (Turkey) Fenerbahçe
- Final Four MVP: (Greece) Kostas Sloukas

Statistical leaders
Points	(Puerto Rico) Markus Howard	19.5
Rebounds	(Slovenia) Josh Nebo	7.1
Assists	(Bulgaria) Codi Miller-McIntyre	7.3
Index Rating	(United States) Shane Larkin	19.9

Records
- Biggest home win: Anadolu Efes 100–55 Crvena zvezda (11 April 2024)
- Biggest away win: Maccabi Tel Aviv 70–99 Real Madrid (28 November 2023)
- Highest scoring: Real Madrid 130–126 Anadolu Efes (5 January 2024)
- Winning streak: 10 games Real Madrid
- Losing streak: 11 games ALBA Berlin
- Highest attendance: 20,875; Crvena zvezda 76–85 Barcelona (2 February 2024)
- Lowest attendance: 0 officially 15 matches
- All statistics correct as of 8 May 2024.^{1} Sponsored league name, referring to Turkish Airlines.

The 2023–24 Turkish Airlines EuroLeague was the 24th season of the modern era of the EuroLeague, and the 14th under the title sponsorship of Turkish Airlines. Including the competition's previous incarnation as the FIBA Europe Champions Cup, this was the 67th season of the premier basketball competition for European men's clubs.

For the third straight season, CSKA Moscow had their EuroLeague license rescinded following the Russian invasion of Ukraine. Additionally, due to the war in Gaza, Maccabi Tel Aviv played abroad during most of the season, principally at Aleksandar Nikolic Hall in Belgrade; all games were behind closed doors.

This season introduced the play-ins, which makes the seventh to tenth-placed teams compete for their playoff spots.

== Team allocation ==
=== Distribution ===
The following is the access list for this season.

Access list for 2023–24 EuroLeague
	Teams entering in this round	Teams advancing from a previous round
Regular season (18 teams)	12 licensed clubs with a long-term license; 1 associated clubs with a two-year licence; 5 associated clubs with an annual licence; 3 one-year wild cards; 2 EuroCup Finalists	
Play-in (4 teams)		Teams placed 7–10
Playoffs (8 teams)		Teams placed 1–6; Winners of the play-ins
Final Four (4 teams)		4 series winners from the playoffs

=== Qualified teams ===
The labels in the parentheses show how each team qualified for the place of its starting round:

Qualified teams for 2023–24 EuroLeague Licensed clubs
(Spain) Barcelona	(Greece) Olympiacos	(Turkey) Anadolu Efes	(Lithuania) Žalgiris
(Spain) Baskonia	(Greece) Panathinaikos	(Turkey) Fenerbahçe	(Germany) Bayern Munich
(Spain) Real Madrid	(Israel) Maccabi Tel Aviv	(Italy) Olimpia Milano	(France) ASVEL

Associated clubs
(France) Monaco (EC)	(Spain) Valencia Basket (EC)	(Germany) ALBA Berlin (LC)	(Serbia) Partizan (ABA)
(Italy) Virtus Bologna (WC)	(Serbia) Crvena zvezda (WC)		

Notes

1. EuroCup: 2022–23 EuroCup Basketball winners Dreamland Gran Canaria decided against taking part in the competition, citing budgetary concerns. Valencia were voted in to replace them as a Spanish team instead of the other finalist Türk Telekom.
2. France (FRA): AS Monaco is a club based in Monaco (which does not qualify for European competitions), but participate in European competitions through one of the berths for France (any coefficient points it earns count toward France)

== Teams ==
=== Venues and locations ===
Location of teams in 2023–24 EuroLeague

Team	Home city	Arena	Capacity	Kit manufacturer
(Germany) ALBA Berlin	Berlin	Uber Arena	14,500	Adidas
(Turkey) Anadolu Efes	Istanbul	Sinan Erdem Dome	16,000	Bilcee
(Spain) Barcelona	Barcelona	Palau Blaugrana	7,786	Nike
(Spain) Baskonia	Vitoria-Gasteiz	Buesa Arena	15,504	Puma
(Germany) Bayern Munich	Munich	BMW Park	6,700	Adidas
(Basketball Federation of Serbia) Crvena zvezda Meridianbet	Belgrade	Belgrade Arena	20,094	Adidas
(Italy) EA7 Emporio Armani Milan	Milan	Forum	12,700	EA7
(Turkey) Fenerbahçe Beko	Istanbul	Ülker Sports and Event Hall	13,059	Adidas
(France) LDLC ASVEL	Villeurbanne	Astroballe	5,560	Adidas
(France) LDLC ASVEL	Villeurbanne	LDLC Arena	12,523	Adidas
(Israel) Maccabi Playtika Tel Aviv	Tel Aviv	Menora Mivtachim Arena	10,383	Puma
(Israel) Maccabi Playtika Tel Aviv	Tel Aviv	Aleksandar Nikolić Hall	8,000	Puma
(Israel) Maccabi Playtika Tel Aviv	Tel Aviv	Belgrade Arena	20,094	Puma
(France) AS Monaco	Monaco	Salle Gaston Médecin	5,000	Adidas
(Greece) Olympiacos	Piraeus	Peace and Friendship Stadium	11,847	GSA
(Greece) Panathinaikos	Athens	OAKA Altion	18,300	Adidas
(Basketball Federation of Serbia) Partizan Mozzart Bet	Belgrade	Belgrade Arena	20,094	Under Armour
(Spain) Real Madrid	Madrid	WiZink Center	13,109	Adidas
(Spain) Valencia Basket	Valencia	La Fonteta	8,500	Luanvi
(Italy) Virtus Segafredo Bologna	Bologna	Segafredo Arena	9,980	Macron
(Italy) Virtus Segafredo Bologna	Bologna	PalaDozza	5,570	Macron
(Lithuania) Žalgiris	Kaunas	Žalgirio Arena	15,415	GSA

=== Managerial changes ===
Team	Outgoing manager	Manner of departure	Date of vacancy	Position in table	Replaced with	Date of appointment
(German Basketball Federation) Bayern Munich	(Italian Basketball Federation) Andrea Trinchieri	Mutual agreement	2 June 2023	Pre-season	(Spanish Basketball Federation) Pablo Laso	12 June 2023
(Hellenic Basketball Federation) Panathinaikos	(Hellenic Basketball Federation) Christos Serelis	End of contract	20 June 2023	Pre-season	(Turkish Basketball Federation) Ergin Ataman	20 June 2023
(Turkish Basketball Federation) Anadolu Efes	(Turkish Basketball Federation) Ergin Ataman	Signed by Panathinaikos	20 June 2023	Pre-season	(Turkish Basketball Federation) Erdem Can	20 June 2023
(Spanish Basketball Federation) Barcelona	(Lithuanian Basketball Federation) Šarūnas Jasikevičius	End of contract	26 June 2023	Pre-season	(Spanish Basketball Federation) Roger Grimau	26 June 2023
(Italian Basketball Federation) Virtus Bologna	(Italian Basketball Federation) Sergio Scariolo	Sacked	15 September 2023	Pre-season	(Italian Basketball Federation) Luca Banchi	15 September 2023
(French Federation of Basketball) ASVEL	(French Federation of Basketball) T. J. Parker	Sacked	20 October 2023	18th (0–4)	(Italian Basketball Federation) Gianmarco Pozzecco	25 October 2023
(Basketball Federation of Serbia) Crvena zvezda	(Basketball Federation of Montenegro) Duško Ivanović	Sacked	21 October 2023	13th (1–3)	(Hellenic Basketball Federation) Ioannis Sfairopoulos	22 October 2023
(Spanish Basketball Federation) Baskonia	(Spanish Basketball Federation) Joan Peñarroya	Sacked	30 October 2023	16th (1–4)	(Basketball Federation of Montenegro) Duško Ivanović	30 October 2023
(Turkish Basketball Federation) Fenerbahçe	(Greece) Dimitrios Itoudis	Sacked	13 December 2023	12th (6–7)	(Lithuanian Basketball Federation) Šarūnas Jasikevičius	15 December 2023
(Lithuanian Basketball Federation) Žalgiris	(Lithuanian Basketball Federation) Kazys Maksvytis	Sacked	30 December 2023	16th (5–12)	(Italian Basketball Federation) Andrea Trinchieri	30 December 2023
(French Federation of Basketball) ASVEL	(Italian Basketball Federation) Gianmarco Pozzecco	Sacked	6 January 2024	17th (3–16)	(French Federation of Basketball) Pierric Poupet	6 January 2024
(Turkish Basketball Federation) Anadolu Efes	(Turkish Basketball Federation) Erdem Can	Sacked	1 February 2024	16th (9–15)	(Croatian Basketball Federation) Tomislav Mijatović	8 February 2024
(Spanish Basketball Federation) Valencia	(Spanish Basketball Federation) Álex Mumbrú	Sacked	5 April 2024	13th (14–19)	(Spanish Basketball Federation) Xavi Albert	5 April 2024

=== Referees ===
A total of 67 Euroleague Basketball officials are set to work on the 2023–24 season in EuroLeague and EuroCup:

- (Albanian Basketball Association) Gentian Cici
- (Argentine Basketball Confederation) Leandro Lezcano
- (Basketball Belgium) Nick van den Broeck
- (Basketball Federation of Bosnia and Herzegovina) Dragan Porobić
- (Croatian Basketball Federation) Denis Hadžić
- (Croatian Basketball Federation) Josip Radojković
- (Croatian Basketball Federation) Luka Kardum
- (Croatian Basketball Federation) Sreten Radović
- (Croatian Basketball Federation) Tomislav Hordov
- (Czech Basketball Federation) Robert Vyklický
- (Estonian Basketball Association) Aare Halliko
- (Estonian Basketball Association) Rain Peerandi
- (French Federation of Basketball) Hugues Thépénier
- (French Federation of Basketball) Joseph Bissang
- (French Federation of Basketball) Maxime Boubert
- (French Federation of Basketball) Mehdi Difallah
- (French Federation of Basketball) Thomas Bissuel
- (German Basketball Federation) Anne Panther
- (German Basketball Federation) Robert Lottermoser
- (German Basketball Federation) Steve Bittner
- (British Basketball) Eduard Udyanskyy
- (Hellenic Basketball Federation) Ioannis Foufis
- (Hellenic Basketball Federation) Vassilis Pitsilkas
- (Hellenic Basketball Federation) Vasiliki Tsaroucha
- (Israeli Basketball Association) Adar Peer
- (Israeli Basketball Association) Amit Balak
- (Israeli Basketball Association) Noam Gordon
- (Israeli Basketball Association) Seffi Shemmesh
- (Italian Basketball Federation) Carmelo Paternicò
- (Italian Basketball Federation) Guido Giovannetti
- (Italian Basketball Federation) Michele Rossi
- (Latvian Basketball Association) Kristaps Konstantinovs
- (Latvian Basketball Association) Oļegs Latiševs
- (Lithuanian Basketball Federation) Artūras Šukys
- (Lithuanian Basketball Federation) Gytis Vilius
- (Lithuanian Basketball Federation) Jurgis Laurinavičius
- (Basketball Federation of Montenegro) Igor Dragojević
- (Basketball Federation of Montenegro) Miloš Koljenšić
- (Polish Basketball Federation) Jakub Zamojski
- (Polish Basketball Federation) Marcin Kowalski
- (Polish Basketball Federation) Piotr Pastusiak
- (Polish Basketball Federation) Tomasz Trawicki
- (Portuguese Basketball Federation) Fernando Rocha
- (Portuguese Basketball Federation) Sérgio Silva
- (Basketball Federation of Serbia) Ilija Belošević
- (Basketball Federation of Serbia) Marko Juras
- (Basketball Federation of Serbia) Milivoje Jovčić
- (Basketball Federation of Serbia) Uroš Nikolić
- (Basketball Federation of Serbia) Uroš Obrknežević
- (Basketball Federation of Slovenia) Damir Javor
- (Basketball Federation of Slovenia) Mario Majkić
- (Basketball Federation of Slovenia) Matej Boltauzer
- (Basketball Federation of Slovenia) Milan Nedović
- (Basketball Federation of Slovenia) Saša Pukl
- (Basketball Federation of Slovenia) Sašo Petek
- (Spanish Basketball Federation) Alberto Baena
- (Spanish Basketball Federation) Carlos Cortés
- (Spanish Basketball Federation) Carlos Peruga
- (Spanish Basketball Federation) Emilio Pérez
- (Spanish Basketball Federation) Jordi Aliaga
- (Spanish Basketball Federation) Juan Carlos García
- (Spanish Basketball Federation) Miguel Ángel Pérez
- (Swedish Basketball Federation) Saulius Račys
- (Swiss Basketball) Sébastien Clivaz
- (Turkish Basketball Federation) Emin Moğulkoç
- (Turkish Basketball Federation) Hüseyin Çelik
- (Basketball Federation of Ukraine) Borys Ryzhyk

== Regular season ==
=== League table ===
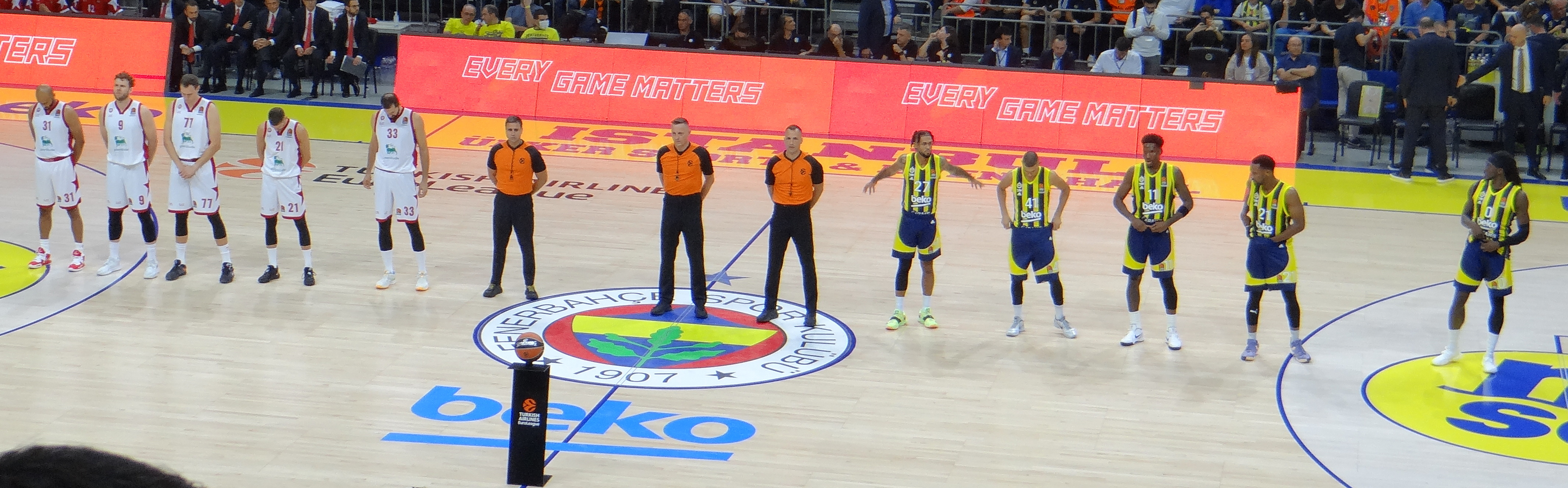
2023–24 EuroLeague opening week Fenerbahçe Beko vs EA7 Emporio Armani Milan pre-game ceremony

Pos	Team	Pld	W	L	PF	PA	PD	Qualification
1	(Spanish Basketball Federation) Real Madrid	34	27	7	2924	2681	+243	Qualification to playoffs
2	(Hellenic Basketball Federation) Panathinaikos AKTOR	34	23	11	2752	2580	+172	Qualification to playoffs
3	(French Federation of Basketball) AS Monaco	34	23	11	2770	2671	+99	Qualification to playoffs
4	(Spanish Basketball Federation) Barcelona	34	22	12	2812	2692	+120	Qualification to playoffs
5	(Hellenic Basketball Federation) Olympiacos	34	22	12	2658	2538	+120	Qualification to playoffs
6	(Turkish Basketball Federation) Fenerbahçe Beko	34	20	14	2855	2723	+132	Qualification to playoffs
7	(Israeli Basketball Association) Maccabi Playtika Tel Aviv	34	20	14	2969	2939	+30	Qualification to play-in
8	(Spanish Basketball Federation) Baskonia	34	18	16	2849	2867	−18	Qualification to play-in
9	(Turkish Basketball Federation) Anadolu Efes	34	17	17	2871	2855	+16	Qualification to play-in
10	(Italian Basketball Federation) Virtus Segafredo Bologna	34	17	17	2728	2804	−76	Qualification to play-in
11	(Basketball Federation of Serbia) Partizan Mozzart Bet	34	16	18	2782	2802	−20	
12	(Italian Basketball Federation) EA7 Emporio Armani Milan	34	15	19	2645	2631	+14	
13	(Spanish Basketball Federation) Valencia Basket	34	14	20	2578	2674	−96	
14	(Lithuanian Basketball Federation) Žalgiris	34	14	20	2694	2692	+2	
15	(German Basketball Federation) Bayern Munich	34	13	21	2604	2724	−120	
16	(Basketball Federation of Serbia) Crvena zvezda Meridianbet	34	11	23	2764	2816	−52	
17	(French Federation of Basketball) LDLC ASVEL	34	9	25	2646	2859	−213	
18	(German Basketball Federation) ALBA Berlin	34	5	29	2591	2944	−353	

Source: EuroLeague
Rules for classification: All points scored in extra period(s) were not counted in the standings, nor for any tie-break situation.

=== Regulations ===
When more than two teams are tied, the ranking is established taking into account the victories obtained in the games played only among them. Should the tie persist among some, but not all, of the teams, the ranking of the teams still tied is determined by again taking into account the victories in the games played only among them, and repeating this same procedure until the tie is entirely resolved. If a tie persists, the ranking is determined by the point difference in favour and against in the games played only among the teams still tied.

=== Results ===
Home \ Away	BER	EFS	BAR	BKN	BAY	CZV	EAM	FNB	ASV	MTA	ASM	OLY	PAO	PAR	RMB	VAL	VIR	ZAL
ALBA Berlin	—	89–97	74–70	86–91	65–82	89–80	85–82	82–91	68–73	71–106	82–90	67–94	85–99	83–94	79–86	66–81	68–83	64–62
Anadolu Efes	85–84	—	98–74	80–87	109–86	100–55	79–73	84–89	89–84	105–91	78–80	85–72	71–68	100–94	80–103	77–73	99–75	86–82
Barcelona	93–77	91–74	—	89–85	98–59	86–81	86–90	89–81	101–92	92–89	67–77	86–78	80–72	94–76	83–78	74–70	84–57	91–73
Baskonia	88–71	76–97	94–71	—	68–76	87–85	88–73	80–79	94–80	92–82	75–77	80–69	75–73	84–83	77–79	62–77	81–91	82–99
Bayern Munich	80–68	86–71	79–87	112–109	—	74–66	91–84	67–76	64–76	74–89	80–91	72–76	75–82	94–85	71–92	85–84	90–76	64–58
Crvena zvezda Meridianbet	85–71	97–83	76–85	90–91	74–68	—	71–93	87–56	94–73	80–84	76–82	86–89	76–89	88–72	58–72	82–64	94–79	91–93
EA7 Emporio Armani Milan	82–76	92–76	74–70	76–67	76–62	62–76	—	77–76	84–61	90–98	66–72	65–53	68–76	85–83	81–76	83–52	90–75	70–83
Fenerbahçe Beko	103–68	80–82	88–74	111–96	98–91	76–85	85–82	—	101–86	109–74	86–74	79–77	83–69	91–76	100–99	118–88	88–75	80–78
LDLC ASVEL	63–88	84–80	76–72	81–88	100–101	100–91	81–77	73–83	—	91–94	77–87	73–85	81–89	62–88	76–77	55–78	84–87	93–79
Maccabi Playtika Tel Aviv	102–81	95–86	90–92	89–81	93–90	92–98	92–86	78–73	98–90	—	93–83	74–79	90–75	96–81	70–99	95–80	95–78	83–76
AS Monaco	86–75	82–89	91–71	93–83	89–85	98–80	80–98	76–69	80–70	107–79	—	85–77	90–91	85–70	98–74	79–78	59–83	69–66
Olympiacos	101–87	75–57	68–77	74–75	77–69	88–83	79–74	84–81	80–64	89–72	75–73	—	71–65	98–94	71–77	56–63	74–69	89–72
Panathinaikos	84–75	83–76	89–81	95–81	78–71	82–65	79–62	74–63	85–67	81–86	88–63	78–88	—	84–71	78–90	90–73	90–76	73–71
Partizan Mozzart Bet	89–74	100–90	83–92	87–83	78–79	88–86	82–69	85–84	90–77	88–79	89–85	69–74	92–87	—	76–88	79–66	75–77	81–72
Real Madrid	99–75	130–126	65–64	91–95	88–73	101–94	88–71	79–89	86–79	106–101	91–73	90–85	86–97	91–75	—	96–86	100–74	93–79
Valencia Basket	79–71	93–88	78–88	84–98	70–68	85–81	84–72	77–74	69–98	75–66	70–65	65–78	81–82	67–72	73–76	—	79–71	79–84
Virtus Segafredo Bologna	87–76	93–81	80–75	91–95	85–83	85–79	86–79	87–79	73–63	100–90	78–81	69–67	79–81	88–84	74–89	87–74	—	79–82
Žalgiris	77–71	96–70	80–85	94–76	74–73	79–74	87–73	98–75	88–91	70–78	79–83	76–95	80–68	85–93	62–64	72–87	96–81	—

Updated to match(es) played on 11 April 2024. Source: EuroLeague
Legend: Blue = home team win; Red = away team win.
Matches with lighter background shading were decided after overtime.

== Play-in ==
Under the new format, the 7th to 10th-ranked teams faced each other in the play-in. Each game is hosted by the team with the higher regular season record. The format was similar to the first two rounds of the Page–McIntyre system for a four-team playoff that was identical to that of the NBA play-in tournament. First, the 7th seed hosted the 8th seed, with the winner advancing to the playoffs; likewise the 9th seed hosted the 10th seed, with the loser eliminated. Then the loser of the 7-v-8 game hosted the winner of the 9-v-10 game, with the winner of that game getting the final playoff spot.

Round 1
Play-In A
7	(Israel) Maccabi Playtika Tel Aviv	113
8	(Spain) Baskonia	85
Play-In B
9	(Turkey) Anadolu Efes	64
10	(Italy) Virtus Segafredo Bologna	67

Round 2
Play-In C
8	(Spain) Baskonia	89
10	(Italy) Virtus Segafredo Bologna	77

== Playoffs ==
Playoffs series are best-of-five. The first team to win three games wins the series. A 2–2–1 format is used – teams with home-court advantage play games 1, 2, and 5 at home, while their opponents host games 3 and 4. Games 4 and 5 are only played if necessary. The four winning teams advance to the Final Four.

=== Series ===
Team 1	Series	Team 2	Game 1	Game 2	Game 3	Game 4	Game 5
Real Madrid (Spanish Basketball Federation)	3–0	(Spanish Basketball Federation) Baskonia	90–74	101–90	102–98	—	—
Panathinaikos AKTOR (Hellenic Basketball Federation)	3–2	(Israeli Basketball Association) Maccabi Playtika Tel Aviv	87–91	95–79	83–85	95–88	81–72
AS Monaco (French Federation of Basketball)	2–3	(Turkish Basketball Federation) Fenerbahçe Beko	91–95	93–88	78–89	65–62	79–80
Barcelona (Spanish Basketball Federation)	2–3	(Hellenic Basketball Federation) Olympiacos	75–77	77–69	82–80	58–92	59–63

== Final Four ==
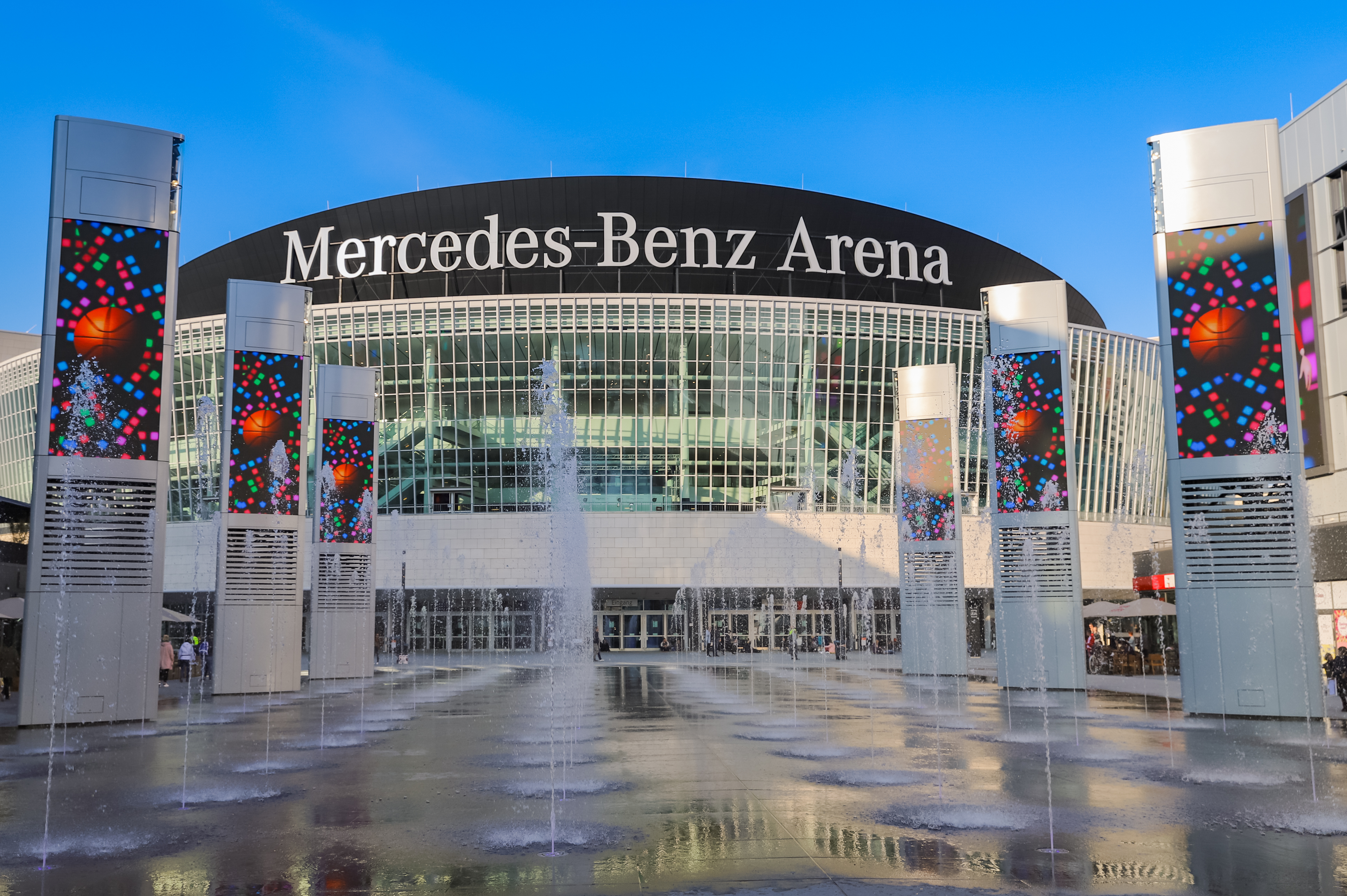
Uber Arena (in the photo with its former name Mercedes-Benz Arena) in Berlin, Germany

The final four were hosted by the Uber Arena in Berlin, Germany, as was announced by EuroLeague Basketball on 19 December 2022. Berlin becomes the first city to host three Final Fours in league history, having already hosted the tournament in 2009 and 2016.

Semifinals
24 May
(Spanish Basketball Federation) Real Madrid	87
(Hellenic Basketball Federation) Olympiacos	76
24 May
(Hellenic Basketball Federation) Panathinaikos	73
(Turkish Basketball Federation) Fenerbahçe Beko	57

Championship game
26 May
(Spanish Basketball Federation) Real Madrid	80
(Hellenic Basketball Federation) Panathinaikos	95
Third place game
26 May
(Hellenic Basketball Federation) Olympiacos	87
(Turkish Basketball Federation) Fenerbahçe Beko	84

== Awards ==
All official awards of the 2023–24 EuroLeague.

=== EuroLeague MVP ===
- (United States) Mike James ( (France) AS Monaco)

=== EuroLeague Final Four MVP ===
- (Greece) Kostas Sloukas ( (Greece) Panathinaikos AKTOR)

=== All-EuroLeague Teams ===
Pos.	First Team		Second Team	
G	(Argentina) Facundo Campazzo	(Spain) Real Madrid	(Greece) Kostas Sloukas	(Greece) Panathinaikos AKTOR
G	(United States) Mike James	(France) AS Monaco	(Spain) Lorenzo Brown	(Israel) Maccabi Playtika Tel Aviv
F	(United States) Kendrick Nunn	(Greece) Panathinaikos AKTOR	(United States) Wade Baldwin	(Israel) Maccabi Playtika Tel Aviv
F	(United States) Nigel Hayes-Davis	(Turkey) Fenerbahçe Beko	(Croatia) Mario Hezonja	(Spain) Real Madrid
C	(France) Mathias Lessort	(Greece) Panathinaikos AKTOR	(Cape Verde) Edy Tavares	(Spain) Real Madrid

=== Alphonso Ford Top Scorer Trophy ===
- (United States) Markus Howard ( (Spain) Baskonia)

=== Best Defender ===
- (Greece) Thomas Walkup ( (Greece) Olympiacos)

=== Rising Star ===
- (Italy) Gabriele Procida ( (Germany) ALBA Berlin)

=== Coach of the Year ===
- (Spain) Chus Mateo ( (Spain) Real Madrid)

=== MVP of the Round ===
Regular season

Round	Player	Team	PIR	Ref.
1	(Bosnia and Herzegovina) Alec Peters	(Greece) Olympiacos	31	
2	(France) Guerschon Yabusele	(Spain) Real Madrid	39	
3	(Georgia (country)) Tornike Shengelia	(Italy) Virtus Segafredo Bologna	32	
4	(Serbia) Nikola Milutinov	(Greece) Olympiacos	30	
5	(France) Mathias Lessort	(Greece) Panathinaikos	31	
6	(Georgia (country)) Tornike Shengelia (2)	(Italy) Virtus Segafredo Bologna	30	
7	(Argentina) Facundo Campazzo	(Spain) Real Madrid	39	
8	(Bulgaria) Codi Miller-McIntyre	(Spain) Baskonia	29	
9	(Nigeria) Chima Moneke	(Spain) Baskonia	35	
10	(Turkey) Shane Larkin	(Turkey) Anadolu Efes	38	
10	(Germany) Maodo Lô	(Italy) EA7 Emporio Armani Milan	38	
11	(Spain) Serge Ibaka	(Germany) Bayern Munich	34	
12	(United States) Tyrique Jones	(Turkey) Anadolu Efes	36	
13	(Turkey) Shane Larkin (2)	(Turkey) Anadolu Efes	41	
14	(Greece) Kostas Sloukas	(Greece) Panathinaikos AKTOR	29	
15	(Slovenia) Josh Nebo	(Israel) Maccabi Playtika Tel Aviv	25	
15	(United States) Kevin Punter	(Serbia) Partizan Mozzart Bet	25	
15	(Denmark) Shavon Shields	(Italy) EA7 Emporio Armani Milan	25	
16	(Serbia) Miloš Teodosić	(Serbia) Crvena zvezda Meridianbet	40	
17	(Germany) Johannes Voigtmann	(Italy) EA7 Emporio Armani Milan	29	
18	(Nigeria) Chima Moneke (2)	(Spain) Baskonia	34	
18	(United States) Bonzie Colson	(Israel) Maccabi Playtika Tel Aviv	34	
19	(Bosnia and Herzegovina) Džanan Musa	(Spain) Real Madrid	45	
20	(United States) Wade Baldwin	(Israel) Maccabi Playtika Tel Aviv	29	
21	(France) Mathias Lessort (2)	(Greece) Panathinaikos AKTOR	42	
22	(Serbia) Nikola Milutinov (2)	(Greece) Olympiacos	40	
23	(United States) Wade Baldwin (2)	(Israel) Maccabi Playtika Tel Aviv	33	
24	(United States) Mike James	(France) AS Monaco	31	
25	(United States) Keenan Evans	(Lithuania) Žalgiris	35	
26	(Bulgaria) Codi Miller-McIntyre (2)	(Spain) Baskonia	42	
27	(France) Mathias Lessort (3)	(Greece) Panathinaikos AKTOR	33	
28	(United States) Shane Larkin (3)	(Turkey) Anadolu Efes	33	
29	(Slovenia) Josh Nebo (2)	(Israel) Maccabi Playtika Tel Aviv	33	
30	(United States) Wade Baldwin (3)	(Israel) Maccabi Playtika Tel Aviv	46	
31	(United States) Elijah Bryant	(Turkey) Anadolu Efes	33	
31	(Croatia) Mario Hezonja	(Spain) Real Madrid	33	
32	(United States) Nigel Hayes-Davis	(Turkey) Fenerbahçe Beko	46	
33	(United States) Will Clyburn	(Turkey) Anadolu Efes	28	
34	(Puerto Rico) Markus Howard	(Spain) Baskonia	27	
34	(United States) James Nunnally	(Serbia) Partizan Mozzart Bet	27	
34	(Greece) Kostas Sloukas (2)	(Greece) Panathinaikos AKTOR	27	

Play-in

Round	Player	Team	PIR	Ref.
Play-in	(Spain) Lorenzo Brown	(Israel) Maccabi Playtika Tel Aviv	35	

Playoffs

Round	Player	Team	PIR	Ref.
1	(United States) Nigel Hayes-Davis (2)	(Turkey) Fenerbahçe Beko	23	
2	(Argentina) Facundo Campazzo (2)	(Spain) Real Madrid	33	
3	(Slovenia) Josh Nebo (3)	(Israel) Maccabi Playtika Tel Aviv	31	
4	(Greece) Kostas Sloukas (3)	(Greece) Panathinaikos AKTOR	32	
5	(United States) Kendrick Nunn	(Greece) Panathinaikos AKTOR	27	

=== MVP of the Month ===
Month	Round	Player	Team	Ref.
2023
October	1–5	(Georgia (country)) Tornike Shengelia	(Italy) Virtus Segafredo Bologna	
November	6–11	(Argentina) Facundo Campazzo	(Spain) Real Madrid	
December	12–17	(Croatia) Mario Hezonja	(Spain) Real Madrid	
2024
January	18–24	(Bosnia and Herzegovina) Džanan Musa	(Spain) Real Madrid	
February	25–27	(United States) Mike James	(France) AS Monaco	
March	28–32	(United States) Wade Baldwin	(Israel) Maccabi Playtika Tel Aviv	
April/May	33–PO5	(United States) Kendrick Nunn	(Greece) Panathinaikos AKTOR	

== Statistics ==
=== Individual statistics ===
==== Rating ====
Rank	Name	Team	Games	Rating	PIR
1.	(United States) Shane Larkin	(Turkey) Anadolu Efes	35	698	19.9
2.	(France) Mathias Lessort	(Greece) Panathinaikos AKTOR	41	805	19.6
3.	(United States) Mike James	(France) AS Monaco	39	758	19.4

Source: EuroLeague

==== Points ====
Rank	Name	Team	Games	Points	PPG
1.	(Puerto Rico) Markus Howard	(Spain) Baskonia	39	759	19.5
2.	(United States) Mike James	(France) AS Monaco	39	700	17.9
3.	(United States) Wade Baldwin	(Israel) Maccabi Playtika Tel Aviv	30	522	17.4

Source: EuroLeague

==== Rebounds ====
Rank	Name	Team	Games	Rebounds	RPG
1.	(Slovenia) Josh Nebo	(Israel) Maccabi Playtika Tel Aviv	39	276	7.1
2.	(Spain) Serge Ibaka	(Germany) Bayern Munich	28	191	6.8
3.	(Lithuania) Tadas Sedekerskis	(Spain) Baskonia	35	235	6.7

Source: EuroLeague

==== Assists ====
Rank	Name	Team	Games	Assists	APG
1.	(Bulgaria) Codi Miller-McIntyre	(Spain) Baskonia	39	284	7.3
2.	(Argentina) Facundo Campazzo	(Spain) Real Madrid	37	240	6.5
3.	(Spain) Lorenzo Brown	(Israel) Maccabi Playtika Tel Aviv	38	231	6.1

Source: EuroLeague

==== Blocks ====
Rank	Name	Team	Games	Blocks	BPG
1.	(Cape Verde) Edy Tavares	(Spain) Real Madrid	34	52	1.5
1.	(France) Vincent Poirier	(Spain) Real Madrid	37	54	1.5
2.	(France) Moustapha Fall	(Greece) Olympiacos	36	44	1.2

Source: EuroLeague

==== Other statistics ====
Category	Player	Team	Games	Average
Steals	(Cameroon) Paris Lee	(France) LDLC ASVEL	33	1.7
Turnovers	(United States) Kendrick Nunn	(Greece) Panathinaikos AKTOR	35	3.0
Fouls drawn	(France) Mathias Lessort	(Greece) Panathinaikos AKTOR	41	6.6
Minutes	(United States) Mike James	(France) AS Monaco	39	31:23
FT %	(United States) Kendrick Nunn	(Greece) Panathinaikos AKTOR	35	95.8%
2-Point %	(France) Moustapha Fall	(Greece) Olympiacos	36	78.9%
3-Point %	(Bosnia and Herzegovina) Alec Peters	(Greece) Olympiacos	40	53.5%

=== Individual game highs ===
Category	Player	Team	Statistic	Opponent
Rating	(United States) Nigel Hayes-Davis	(Turkey) Fenerbahçe Beko	46	(Germany) ALBA Berlin (29 March 2024)
Rating	(United States) Wade Baldwin	(Israel) Maccabi Playtika Tel Aviv	46	(France) LDLC ASVEL (19 March 2024)
Points	(United States) Nigel Hayes-Davis	(Turkey) Fenerbahçe Beko	50	(Germany) ALBA Berlin (29 March 2024)
Rebounds	(Serbia) Nikola Milutinov	(Greece) Olympiacos	20	(Israel) Maccabi Playtika Tel Aviv (18 January 2024)
Assists	(Bulgaria) Codi Miller-McIntyre	(Spain) Baskonia	20	(France) LDLC ASVEL (8 February 2024)
Steals	(United States) PJ Dozier	(Serbia) Partizan Mozzart Bet	6	(Greece) Panathinaikos AKTOR (19 January 2024)
Blocks	(France) Moustapha Fall	(Greece) Olympiacos	8	(France) LDLC ASVEL (22 December 2023)

=== Team statistics ===
Category	Team	Average
Rating	(Spain) Real Madrid	107.6
Points	(Spain) Real Madrid	88.7
Rebounds	(Spain) Real Madrid	36.5
Assists	(Spain) Real Madrid	20.6
Steals	(Greece) Olympiacos	7.3
Blocks	(Spain) Real Madrid	3.6
Turnovers	(Germany) ALBA Berlin	15.1
FT %	(Serbia) Partizan Mozzart Bet	81.9%
2-Point %	(Serbia) Partizan Mozzart Bet	58.5%
3-Point %	(Turkey) Fenerbahçe Beko	39.2%

== Attendances ==
Pos	Team	Total	High	Low	Average	Change
1	(Basketball Federation of Serbia) Partizan Mozzart bet	338,574	20,200	18,912	19,916	+11.0%
2	(Basketball Federation of Serbia) Crvena Zvezda	303,316	20,875	12,537	17,842	+151.8%
3	(Hellenic Basketball Federation) Panathinaikos AKTOR	305,973	18,541	6,451	15,299	+147.4%
4	(Lithuanian Basketball Federation) Žalgiris	251,136	15,222	12,881	14,773	−0.4%
5	Final Four in Berlin	54,312	13,578	13,578	13,578	+24.9%
6	(Turkish Basketball Federation) Anadolu Efes	216,660	15,124	7,816	12,745	−2.8%
7	(Hellenic Basketball Federation) Olympiacos	219,159	12,240	8,127	11,535	+10.3%
8	(Turkish Basketball Federation) Fenerbahçe Beko	188,304	12,960	7,251	10,461	+0.6%
9	(Italian Basketball Federation) EA7 Emporio Armani Milan	170,870	12,486	7,814	10,051	+9.8%
10	(Spanish Basketball Federation) Baskonia	189,423	14,017	7,542	9,970	+11.6%
11	(German Basketball Federation) ALBA Berlin	159,895	13,247	5,566	9,406	+6.6%
12	(Spanish Basketball Federation) Real Madrid	169,363	11,432	5,984	8,914	+9.7%
13	(Italian Basketball Federation) Virtus Segafredo Bologna	136,559	9,630	4,437	8,033	+31.0%
14	(French Federation of Basketball) LDLC ASVEL	128,605	11,354	4,370	7,565	+46.0%
15	(Spanish Basketball Federation) Barcelona	128,875	7,742	4,588	6,444	+1.4%
16	(Spanish Basketball Federation) Valencia Basket	108,281	7,997	2,809	6,369	+5.0%
17	(German Basketball Federation) Bayern Munich	105,712	6,410	5,597	6,218	+13.3%
18	(French Federation of Basketball) AS Monaco	81,042	5,000	2,164	4,052	−7.7%
19	(Israeli Basketball Association) Maccabi Playtika Tel Aviv	12,959	10,559	0	648	−93.8%
	League total	3,256,059	20,875	2,164	10,537	+18.4%

Source: EuroLeague

1. Anadolu Efes game against Maccabi Playtika Tel Aviv was relocated to Arena Riga in Riga, Latvia due to security concerns. It had an attendance of 7,813. The game is not included in league total.
2. Fenerbahçe Beko game against Maccabi Playtika Tel Aviv was relocated to Kalnapilio Arena in Panevėžys, Lithuania due to security concerns. It had an attendance of 2,938. The game is not included in league total.
3. Maccabi Playtika Tel Aviv played their home games at Aleksandar Nikolic Hall in Serbia's capital, Belgrade, due to security concerns derived from the ongoing Gaza war.

== See also ==
- 2023–24 EuroCup Basketball
- 2023–24 Basketball Champions League
- 2023–24 FIBA Europe Cup
- 2023–24 EuroLeague Women
- 2023–24 EuroCup Women
- 2023–24 EuroLeague Women Qualification Round
