= Chus Mateo =

Spanish professional basketball coach

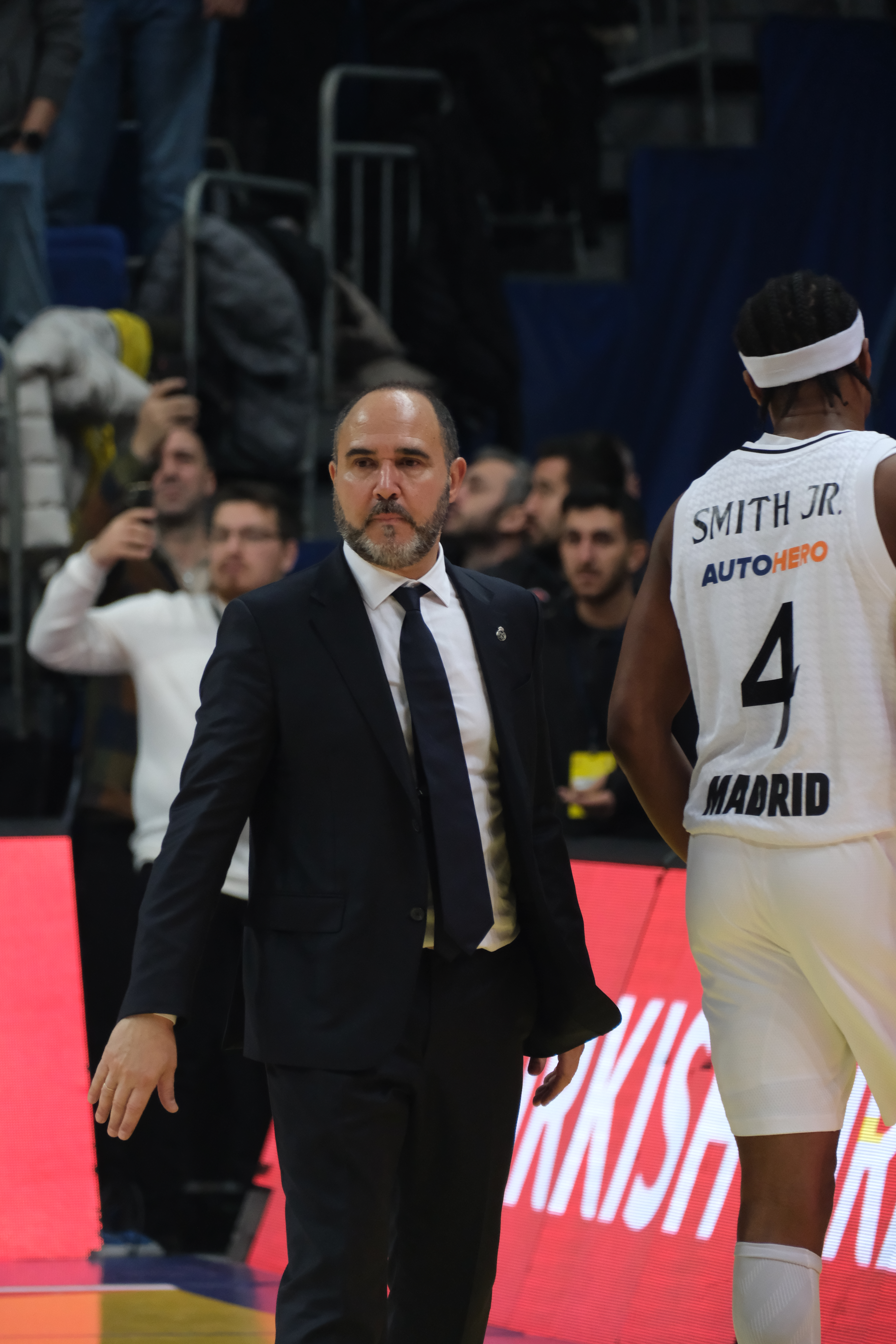
- Mateo in 2025

Personal information
- Born: January 23, 1969 (age 57) Madrid, Spain
- Position: Head coach
- Coaching career: 1993–present

Career history

Coaching
- 1993–1997: Spain U16 (assistant)
- 1995–1997: Real Canoe (assistant)
- 1997–1999: Real Madrid B (assistant)
- 1999–2000, 2002–2004: Real Madrid (assistant)
- 2004–2006: Unicaja Málaga (assistant)
- 2006–2007: CAI Zaragoza
- 2007–2009: Fuenlabrada (assistant)
- 2009: Fuenlabrada
- 2011–2012: Unicaja Málaga
- 2012–2013: Shanxi Brave Dragons
- 2013–2014: Fuenlabrada
- 2014–2022: Real Madrid (assistant)
- 2022–2025: Real Madrid
- 2025-present: Spain

Career highlights
- As head coach: EuroLeague champion (2023); 2× Spanish League champion (2024, 2025); Copa del Rey winner (2024); 2× Spanish Supercup winner (2022, 2023); EuroLeague Coach of the Year (2024); As assistant coach: FIBA Intercontinental Cup winner (2015); 2× EuroLeague champion (2015, 2018); 7× Spanish League champion (2000, 2006, 2015, 2016, 2018, 2019, 2022); 5× Copa del Rey winner (2005, 2015–2017, 2020); 5× Spanish Supercup winner (2014, 2018–2021)

Jesús "Chus" Alfonso Mateo Díez (born January 23, 1969) is a Spanish professional basketball coach, who is the current head coach for Spain men's national basketball team.

== Coaching career ==
Mateo spent most of his career as an assistant coach. He began coaching at the youth basketball teams of the Augustinian College of Madrid and Real Madrid, where he worked from 1991 to 1995. Between 1993 and 1997, he was an assistant coach of Spain U16.

On 27 June 2006, Mateo was appointed by CAI Zaragoza, becoming a head coach for the first time in his career.

In 2012, Mateo went abroad, signing with the Shanxi Zhongyu Brave Dragons of the Chinese Basketball Association.

In 2014, he became Pablo Laso's assistant at Real Madrid. Apart from winning a lot of trophies as Laso's understudy, Mateo also led Madrid to victories as an interim head coach. Under his rein, on 23 December 2021, an extremely depleted due to COVID-19 Real Madrid squad won against highly favored CSKA Moscow. Mateo also led Madrid to a 3–1 victory in the 2022 ACB playoff final series against Barcelona to win a record 36th league title for Los Blancos.

On 5 July 2022, Mateo was promoted to a permanent head coach role after Real Madrid parted ways with Laso. On 21 May 2023, in his first full season as head coach, Mateo led Madrid to their 11th EuroLeague championship despite missing several key players due to injuries and suspensions. On 12 May 2024, Mateo was named EuroLeague Coach of the Year after guiding Real Madrid to first place in the 2023–24 EuroLeague regular season. He also led Madrid to a 3–0 win in the 2024 ACB playoff final series against UCAM Murcia, reclaiming the Spanish league title for Los Blancos after a year off.

== Coaching record ==
Legend
G	Games coached	W	Games won	L	Games lost	W–L %	Win-loss %

Note: The EuroLeague is not the only competition in which the team played during the season. He also coached in domestic competition, and regional competition if applicable.

=== EuroLeague ===
Team	Year	G	W	L	W–L%	Result
Real Madrid	2021–22	3	3	0	1.000	Lost in the final game
Real Madrid	2022–23	41	28	13	.683	Won EuroLeague Championship
Real Madrid	2023–24	39	31	8	.795	Lost in the final game
Career		83	62	21	.747	

== Personal life ==
Mateo has his own basketball academy named after him.
