= Nigel Hayes-Davis =

American basketball player (born 1994)

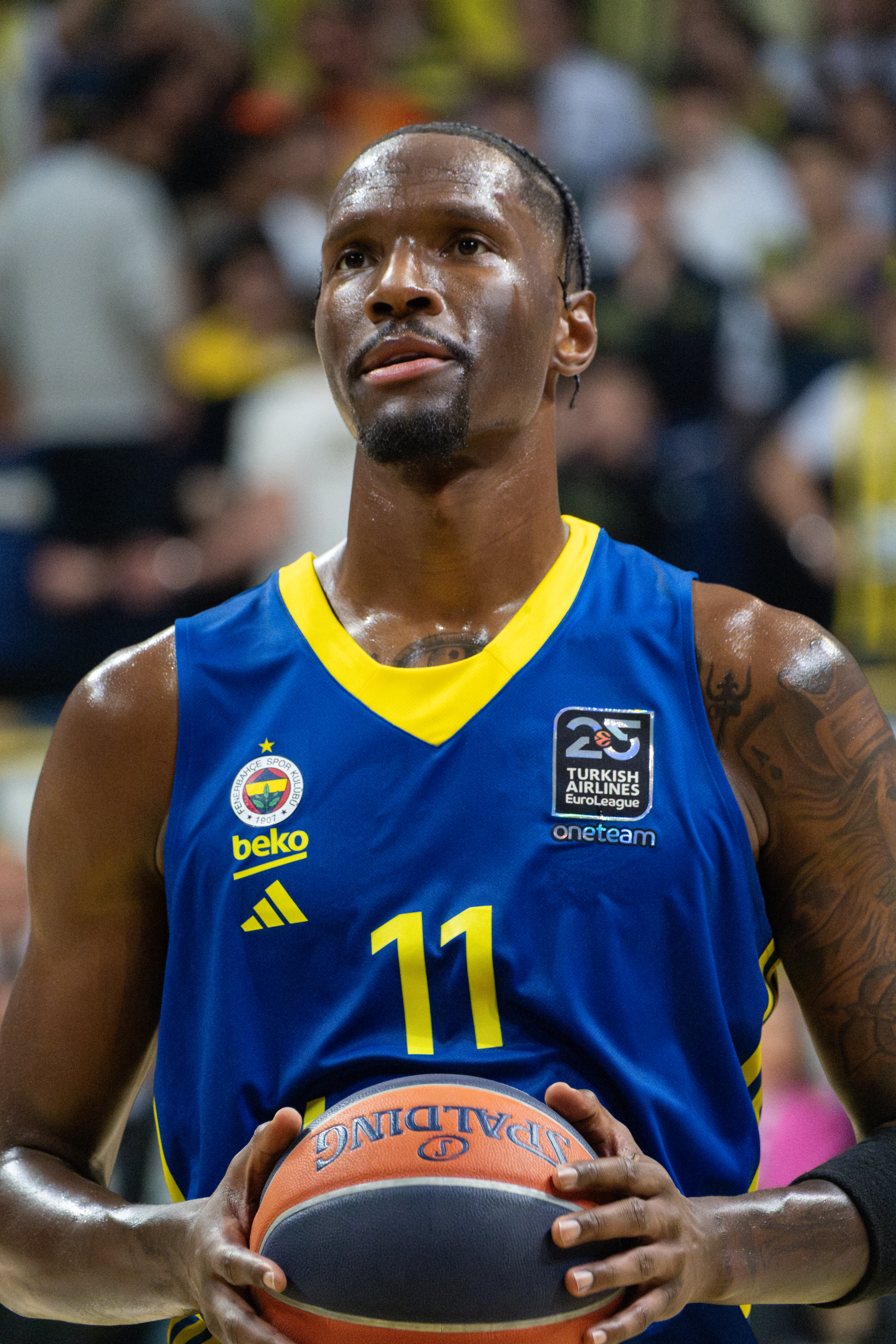
- Hayes-Davis with Fenerbahçe Beko in 2025

No. 11 – Panathinaikos
- Position: Power forward / small forward
- League: Greek Basketball League; EuroLeague

Personal information
- Born: December 16, 1994 (age 31) Westerville, Ohio, U.S.
- Listed height: 6 ft 8 in (2.03 m)
- Listed weight: 254 lb (115 kg)

Career information
- High school: Whitmer (Toledo, Ohio)
- College: Wisconsin (2013–2017)
- NBA draft: 2017: undrafted
- Playing career: 2017–present

Career history
- 2017–2018: Westchester Knicks
- 2018: Los Angeles Lakers
- 2018: Toronto Raptors
- 2018: →Raptors 905
- 2018: Sacramento Kings
- 2018–2019: Galatasaray
- 2019–2021: Žalgiris Kaunas
- 2021–2022: FC Barcelona
- 2022–2025: Fenerbahçe
- 2025–2026: Phoenix Suns
- 2026–present: Panathinaikos

Career highlights
- EuroLeague champion (2025); EuroLeague Final Four MVP (2025); 2× All-EuroLeague First Team (2024, 2025); 2x Turkish Super League champion (2024, 2025); 2x Turkish Cup winner (2024, 2025); Turkish Super League Finals MVP (2024); Turkish Cup Final MVP (2025); 2× LΚL champion (2020, 2021); 2× King Mindaugas Cup winner (2020, 2021); Greek Cup winner (2026); Greek Cup Finals MVP (2026); Spanish Cup winner (2022); NBA G League All-Rookie Team (2018); First-team All-Big Ten (2016); 2× Third-team All-Big Ten (2015, 2017); Big Ten Sixth Man of the Year (2014); Big Ten All-Freshman team (2014)
- Stats at NBA.com
- Stats at Basketball Reference

Nigel Hayes-Davis (né Hayes; born December 16, 1994) is an American professional basketball player for Panathinaikos of the Greek Basketball League and the EuroLeague. He attended Whitmer High School in Toledo, Ohio and played college basketball for the Wisconsin Badgers.

A two-time All-EuroLeague First Team selection, Hayes-Davis holds the record for most points scored in a EuroLeague game, having scored 50 points against Alba Berlin in the 2023–24 season. He won the EuroLeague championship in 2025 with Fenerbahçe, earning the Final Four MVP award in the process.

== High school career ==
College recruiting
| Name | Hometown | School | Height | Weight | Commit date |
|---|---|---|---|---|---|
| Nigel Hayes; PF | Toledo, OH | Whitmer | 6 ft 7 in (2.01 m) | 215 lb (98 kg) | Nov 11, 2012 |
| Nigel Hayes; PF | Recruit ratings: Scout: Rivals: 247Sports: ESPN: | | | | |
Overall recruit ranking:
Note: In many cases, Scout, Rivals, 247Sports, On3, and ESPN may conflict in their listings of height and weight.; In these cases, the average was taken. ESPN grades are on a 100-point scale.; Sources: "2013 Team Ranking". Rivals.

== College career ==
As a freshman in 2013-14, Hayes-Davis was Wisconsin's sixth man, scoring nearly 8 points per game as the Badgers won the Big Ten and made it to the final Four before a narrow loss in the National semis-finals to Kentucky. As a sophomore, he excelled as a starter for all the Badger games, adding 3-point shooting to his repertoire and helping Wisconsin to another Big Ten title and run to the final four including his crucial contributions in an upset of previously undefeated Kentucky in the semi-finals. In his junior season, Hayes was named first-team All-Big Ten after leading the Badgers in scoring (15.7 points per game), assists (3.0) and free-throw attempts (258) and finished second in rebounds (5.8 per game).

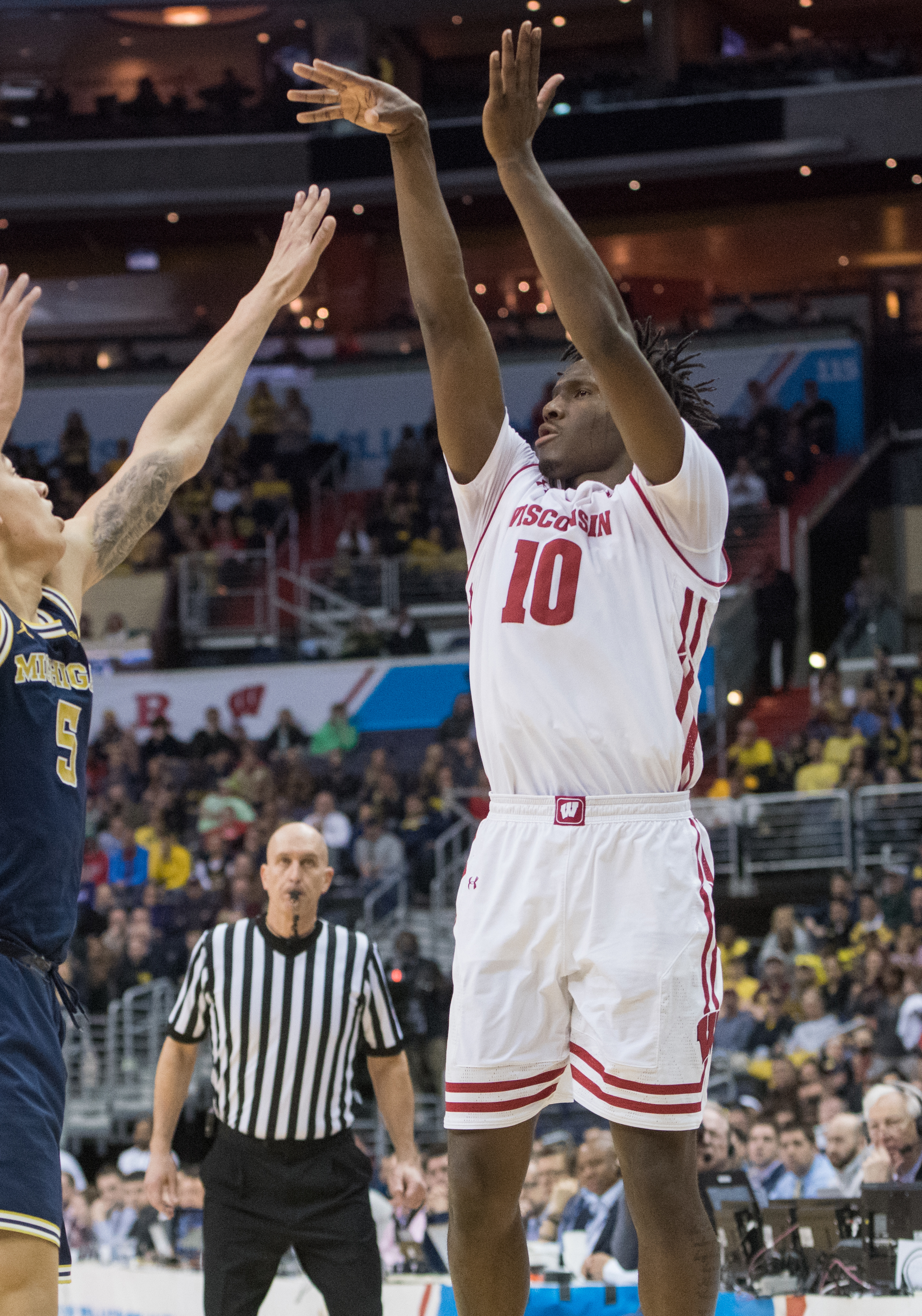
Hayes in 2017

Coming into his senior season, Hayes was named Preseason Big Ten Player of the Year. He averaged 14.0 points, 6.7 rebounds, and 2.7 assists per game during his senior year at Wisconsin.

Hayes graduated in May 2017 with a degree in business finance and investment banking. He was noted for being an outspoken athlete and a leader on issues such as racial justice and compensation of NCAA athletes.

== Professional career ==
=== Westchester Knicks (2017–2018) ===
After going undrafted in the 2017 NBA draft, he joined the New York Knicks for the 2017 NBA Summer League. On August 19, he signed a partially guaranteed deal with the team. On October 14, 2017, he was waived by New York. He was later assigned to the Westchester Knicks affiliate squad for the NBA G League for the majority of the season.

=== Los Angeles Lakers (2018) ===
On January 19, 2018, Hayes signed a 10-day contract with the Los Angeles Lakers. He made his NBA debut two days later in a 127–107 win over the New York Knicks, playing a single minute that night. The Lakers would not give Hayes a second 10-day contract after his first one expired, and subsequently the Westchester Knicks re-acquired Hayes on January 30.

=== Toronto Raptors (2018) ===
On March 6, 2018, the Toronto Raptors signed Hayes to a 10-day contract. On March 12, 2018, Hayes made his debut for the Toronto Raptors scoring 6 points on two 3-point field goals in 5 minutes played in a 132–106 win against the New York Knicks. On March 14, 2018, the Raptors re-signed Hayes to an additional 10-day contract. While on his second ten-day contract, Hayes was assigned to the Raptors 905, Toronto's G League franchise. Hayes did not receive a rest-of-season offer from the Raptors and returned to the Westchester Knicks.

=== Sacramento Kings (2018) ===
On March 31, 2018, the Sacramento Kings announced that they had signed Hayes for the rest of 2017–18 season. On July 7, 2018, he was waived by the Kings.

=== Galatasaray (2018–2019) ===
On August 29, 2018, Hayes signed with Galatasaray of the Turkish Basketbol Süper Ligi (BSL). Hayes averaged 12.6 points per game, 2.0 assists per game and 5.4 rebounds per game. Hayes averaged 15.7 points, 5.6 rebounds and 1.8 assists in the EuroCup.

=== Žalgiris (2019–2021) ===
On June 12, 2019, Hayes signed with Žalgiris Kaunas of the Lithuanian Basketball League. He re-signed with the team on July 17, 2020.

In his first season in EuroLeague Basketball, he averaged 6.3 points, 3.5 rebounds, 1.0 assists with 6.6 pir in 28 games (10 as starter) and in his second season with the team, he averaged 9.5 points, 3.9 rebounds, 1.2 assists with 9.8 pir in 33 games (30 as starter).

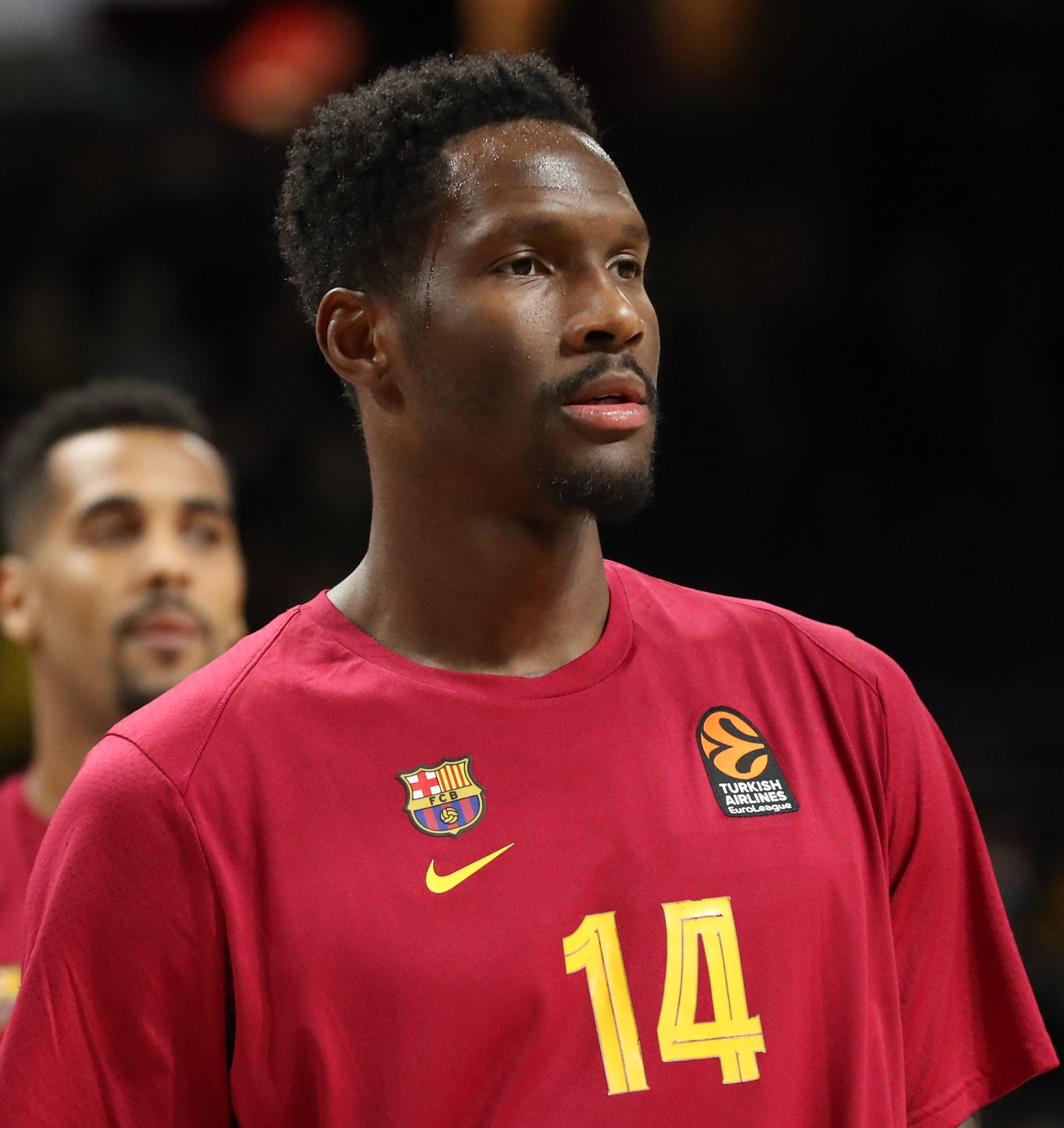
Hayes-Davis with FC Barcelona in 2022

=== Barcelona (2021–2022) ===
After his successful 2020–21 EuroLeague season with Žalgiris Kaunas, on August 22, 2021, Hayes signed with FC Barcelona of the Spanish Liga ACB and reunite with his former coach Šarūnas Jasikevičius. He recorded 4.2 points and 2.1 rebounds with 4.0 pir in 37 games, helped the team to join 2022 EuroLeague Final Four.

=== Fenerbahçe (2022–2025) ===
On July 22, 2022, Hayes-Davis signed a one-year deal with Turkish powerhouse Fenerbahçe. On April 7, 2023, Hayes-Davis renewed his contract with the Turkish club for three (2+1) more seasons.

On 14 December 2023, Šarūnas Jasikevičius was announced as Fenerbahçe head coach, he reunite third time with his former coach.

On March 29, 2024, Hayes-Davis broke the Euroleague record for most scored in a game by a single player, scoring 50 points in a 103–68 win against Alba Berlin. He broke the previous record of 49 points set by Shane Larkin in 2019. He averaged 13.8 points, 4.6 rebounds, 1.7 assists with 15.6 pir in 37 games in his second season with the team, 11.2 points, 4.4 rebounds, 2.0 assists with 12.6 pir in play-offs against Monaco, helped the team after 4 seasons to join 2024 EuroLeague Final Four.

On December 7, 2024, he made 33 points and 4 rebounds with 30 pir against Real Madrid, then earn MVP honors in Round 14 of the 2024-25 Turkish Airlines EuroLeague season. He averaged 16.7 points, 5.3 rebounds, 1.7 assists with 18.3 pir in 39 regular season games, 16.0 points, 5.3 rebounds, 3.0 assists with 21.7 pir in play-offs against Paris Basketball, helped the team to join 2025 EuroLeague Final Four.

On May 25, 2025, Hayes-Davis led Fenerbahçe to their second EuroLeague championship in Abu Dhabi. He helped the team defeat the defending champions Panathinaikos in the semi-final, and Monaco in the final. In the final, he posted game-highs of 23 points and 9 rebounds, and subsequently he was named the EuroLeague Final Four MVP, the second Fenerbahçe player to win the award after Ekpe Udoh in 2017.

=== Phoenix Suns (2025–2026) ===
On July 25, 2025, Hayes-Davis signed with the Phoenix Suns on a one-year, $2.05 million contract. He made 27 appearances for Phoenix during the 2025–26 NBA season, averaging 1.3 points, 1.2 rebounds, and 0.3 assists. On February 5, 2026, Hayes-Davis was traded to the Milwaukee Bucks; however, he was immediately waived by the team.

=== Panathinaikos (2026–present) ===
On February 12, 2026, Hayes-Davis signed with Panathinaikos of the Greek Basketball League (GBL) and the EuroLeague, with a contract through the end of the 2027–28 season.

== International career ==
Hayes-Davis, who was on the "Select Team" that the USA National Team called to prepare the Olympic squad for the tournament, attended the 2024 USA Olympic camp with stars such as LeBron James, Kevin Durant and Stephen Curry.

== Personal life ==
In 2021, Hayes changed his surname to Hayes-Davis in honor of his stepfather.

Hayes-Davis has a cat named Sly, which Hayes-Davis sees as his grey shadow.

== Career statistics ==
Legend
| GP | Games played | GS | Games started | MPG | Minutes per game |
| FG% | Field-goal percentage | 3P% | 3-point field-goal percentage | FT% | Free-throw percentage |
| RPG | Rebounds per game | APG | Assists per game | SPG | Steals per game |
| BPG | Blocks per game | PPG | Points per game | PIR | Performance index rating |
| **Bold** | Career high |

=== NBA ===
| Year | Team | GP | GS | MPG | FG% | 3P% | FT% | RPG | APG | SPG | BPG | PPG |
|---|---|---|---|---|---|---|---|---|---|---|---|---|
| 2017–18 | L.A. Lakers | 2 | 0 | 5.5 | .333 | .000 | **1.000** | — | **1.0** | .0 | .0 | 1.5 |
| 2017–18 | Toronto | 2 | 0 | 3.3 | **1.000** | **1.000** | — | .0 | .0 | .0 | .0 | 3.0 |
| 2017–18 | Sacramento | 5 | 0 | **21.0** | .333 | .167 | .000 | **4.4** | .8 | **.4** | **.6** | **3.6** |
| 2025–26 | Phoenix | **27** | 0 | 7.2 | .326 | .125 | .500 | 1.2 | .3 | .3 | .1 | 1.3 |
| Career | | 36 | 0 | 8.8 | .329 | .188 | .429 | 1.5 | .4 | .3 | .1 | 1.7 |

=== EuroLeague ===
| * | Led the league |
| † | Won the league |

| Year | Team | GP | GS | MPG | FG% | 3P% | FT% | RPG | APG | SPG | BPG | PPG | PIR |
|---|---|---|---|---|---|---|---|---|---|---|---|---|---|
| 2019–20 | Žalgiris | 28* | 10 | 22.3 | .404 | .372 | .758 | 3.5 | 1.0 | .4 | .2 | 6.3 | 6.6 |
| 2020–21 | Žalgiris | 33 | 30 | 26.7 | .443 | **.443** | .894 | 3.9 | 1.2 | 1.1 | .2 | 9.5 | 9.8 |
| 2021–22 | Barcelona | 37 | 16 | 18.9 | .367 | .244 | .800 | 2.1 | .8 | .5 | .1 | 4.2 | 4.0 |
| 2022–23 | Fenerbahçe | **39** | **39** | 30.5 | **.568** | .405 | .750 | 4.4 | 1.5 | **1.2** | .3 | 10.5 | 13.4 |
| 2023–24 | Fenerbahçe | 37 | 36 | **31.5** | .562 | .372 | .832 | 4.6 | 1.7 | 1.0 | .2 | 13.8 | 15.6 |
| 2024–25† | Fenerbahçe | **39** | **39** | 31.2 | .498 | .410 | **.908** | **5.3** | 1.7 | 1.1 | **.4** | **16.7** | **18.3** |
| 2025–26 | Panathinaikos | 16 | 12 | 28.3 | .427 | .341 | .864 | 3.4 | **1.9** | 1.1 | .2 | 14.1 | 12.9 |
| Career | | 229 | 182 | 27.2 | .450 | .386 | .839 | 4.0 | 1.4 | .9 | .2 | 10.7 | 11.7 |

=== EuroCup ===
| Year | Team | GP | GS | MPG | FG% | 3P% | FT% | RPG | APG | SPG | BPG | PPG | PIR |
|---|---|---|---|---|---|---|---|---|---|---|---|---|---|
| 2018–19 | Galatasaray | 10 | 8 | 29.2 | .518 | .432 | .917 | 5.6 | 1.8 | 1.1 | .1 | 15.7 | 17.8 |
| Career | | 10 | 8 | 29.2 | .518 | .432 | .917 | 5.6 | 1.8 | 1.1 | .1 | 15.7 | 17.8 |

=== Domestic leagues ===
| † | Denotes seasons in which Hayes-Davis won the domestic league |

| Year | Team | League | GP | MPG | FG% | 3P% | FT% | RPG | APG | SPG | BPG | PPG |
|---|---|---|---|---|---|---|---|---|---|---|---|---|
| 2017–18 | (United States) Westchester Knicks | G League | 38 | 35.6 | .451 | .454 | .744 | 6.7 | 2.1 | 1.4 | .2 | 16.1 |
| 2017–18 | (United States) Raptors 905 | G League | 5 | 22.4 | .342 | .286 | .250 | 1.4 | 1.6 | 1.2 | .0 | 7.0 |
| 2018–19 | (Turkey) Galatasaray | TBSL | 34 | 30.1 | .459 | .374 | .738 | 5.2 | 2.1 | 1.1 | .3 | 12.3 |
| 2019–20† | (Lithuania) Žalgiris | LKL | 24 | 19.5 | .434 | .350 | .767 | 3.0 | 1.2 | 1.1 | .1 | 7.1 |
| 2020–21† | (Lithuania) Žalgiris | LKL | 38 | 20.4 | .525 | .442 | .704 | 2.6 | 1.6 | 1.0 | .1 | 9.9 |
| 2021–22 | (Spain) Barcelona | ACB | 40 | 20.3 | .464 | .361 | .667 | 2.8 | .6 | 1.0 | .2 | 5.8 |
| 2022–23 | (Turkey) Fenerbahçe | TBSL | 32 | 28.2 | .519 | .458 | .779 | 4.8 | 2.0 | 1.3 | .2 | 12.2 |
| 2023–24† | (Turkey) Fenerbahçe | TBSL | 26 | 26.9 | .525 | .408 | .835 | 3.9 | 2.0 | 1.1 | .3 | 14.3 |
| 2024–25† | (Turkey) Fenerbahçe | TBSL | 36 | 25.2 | .464 | .326 | .846 | 4.4 | 2.0 | .9 | .3 | 13.1 |

=== College ===
| Year | Team | GP | GS | MPG | FG% | 3P% | FT% | RPG | APG | SPG | BPG | PPG |
|---|---|---|---|---|---|---|---|---|---|---|---|---|
| 2013–14 | Wisconsin | 38 | 0 | 17.4 | **.510** | — | .585 | 2.8 | .9 | .8 | **.5** | 7.7 |
| 2014–15 | Wisconsin | **40** | **40** | 32.9 | .497 | **.396** | **.744** | 6.2 | 2.0 | .9 | .4 | 12.4 |
| 2015–16 | Wisconsin | 35 | 35 | **36.2** | .368 | .293 | .736 | 5.8 | **3.0** | **1.1** | .4 | **15.7** |
| 2016–17 | Wisconsin | 37 | 37 | 32.4 | .457 | .314 | .587 | **6.6** | 2.7 | .8 | .4 | 14.0 |
| Career | | 150 | 112 | 29.6 | .446 | .332 | .666 | 5.3 | 2.1 | .9 | .4 | 12.4 |
