= 2025–26 Greek Basketball Cup =

2025–26 Greek Cup
- Season: 2025–26
- Duration: 13 September 2025 – 21 February 2026
- Teams: 58

Finals
- Champions: Panathinaikos (22nd title)
- Runners-up: Olympiacos

Awards
- Final MVP: (United States) Nigel Hayes-Davis

Statistical leaders
Points	(United States) Chris Smith	18.7
Rebounds	(United States) Chris Smith	10.0
Assists	(United States) Jordan King	7.0

The 2025–26 Greek Basketball Cup was the 51st edition of Greek top-tier level professional domestic basketball cup competition. The previous winner of the cup was Panathinaikos. The cup competition started on 13 September 2025 and ended on 21 February 2026. Panathinaikos won the competition for the second time in a row.

== Format ==
The top four placed teams from the top-tier level Greek Basket League's 2025–26 season first round, gained an automatic bye to the 2025–26 Greek Cup Final 8. While the remaining four participants will be decided by a play-in tournament, including the 5th to 12th placed teams in the Greek Basket League 2025–26 season first round and the winner of the Greek UNICEF Trophy, which was contested between the teams from the Greek 2nd Division Elite League, the Greek 3rd Division National League 1, and the Greek 4th Division National League 2.

== Qualification tournament ==
The qualification tournament was a preliminary round between the teams from the 2nd, 3rd and 4th tier of Greek basketball, concluding with the Greek Unicef Trophy final four. EOK

=== UNICEF Trophy Final Four ===
Semifinals; 27 December 2025
Eleftheroupoli	70
Doxa Lefkadas	85
Niki Volou	65
Chalkida	76

Final; 28 December 2025
Chalkida	65
Doxa Lefkadas	74

source: EOK

The 12th placed team in the mid season table, will face the winner of the Greek UNICEF Trophy, with a chance to qualify to the Final 8 play-in tournament.

Doxa Lefkadas	70 – 76	Marousi

=== Play-in ===
Aris	93 – 75	Peristeri
Iraklis	80 – 76	Kolossos Rodou
Mykonos	76 – 75	Karditsa
Promitheas Patras	92 – 100	Marousi

source: ΕΟΚ

== Final 8 ==
Quarterfinals; 17–18 February 2026
Marousi	87
Aris	80
Olympiacos	81
AEK	67
Iraklis	93
Mykonos	65
Panathinaikos	101
PAOK	71

Semifinals; 19 February 2026
Marousi	67
Olympiacos	91
Iraklis	61
Panathinaikos	91

Final; 21 February 2026
Olympiacos	68
Panathinaikos	79

== Final ==
21 February 2026	Olympiacos	68–79	Panathinaikos
19:00 (CET)	Scoring by quarter: 17–17, 12–28, 22–24, 17–10
	Pts: Vezenkov 16; Rebs: Jones 6 Asts: Walkup 9	Boxscore	Pts: Hayes-Davis 15; Rebs: Hayes-Davis 6 Hernangomez 6 Asts: Nunn 5	Arena: Heraklion Indoor Sports Arena

== Awards ==
=== Finals Most Valuable Player ===
Player	Team
(United States) Nigel Hayes-Davis	Panathinaikos

=== Finals Top Scorer ===
Player	Team
(Bulgaria) (Greece) Sasha Vezenkov	Olympiacos
