= 2024 EuroLeague Final Four =

Basketball tournament in Berlin

- Season: 2023–24 EuroLeague

Tournament details
- Arena: Uber Arena; Berlin, Germany
- Dates: 24–26 May 2024

Final positions
- Champions: (Greece) Panathinaikos AKTOR (7th title)
- Runners-up: (Spain) Real Madrid
- Third place: (Greece) Olympiacos
- Fourth place: (Turkey) Fenerbahçe Beko

Awards and statistics
- MVP: (Greece) Kostas Sloukas
- Top scorer(s): (Bosnia and Herzegovina) Alec Peters (43 points)

The 2024 EuroLeague Final Four was the concluding EuroLeague Final Four tournament of the 2023–24 EuroLeague season, the 67th season of Europe's premier club basketball tournament, and the 24th season since it was first organised by Euroleague Basketball. It is the 37th Final Four of the modern EuroLeague Final Four era (1988–present), and the 39th time overall that the competition will conclude with a final four format. Euroleague Basketball announced that the Final Four would be played at the Uber Arena in Berlin, Germany, on 24–26 May 2024.

In the championship game, Panathinaikos AKTOR dethroned Real Madrid, winning their 7th title and returning to European glory after thirteen years.

== Venue ==
On 19 December 2022, it was announced that the Final Four would be played at the Uber Arena in Berlin, Germany, on 24–26 May 2024. Thus, Berlin becomes the first city to host three Final Fours in league history, having already hosted the tournament in 2009 and 2016.

Berlin	2024 EuroLeague Final Four (Europe)
Uber Arena	2024 EuroLeague Final Four (Europe)
Capacity: 14,500	2024 EuroLeague Final Four (Europe)

== Teams ==
Team	Qualified date	Participations (bold indicates winners)
(Spanish Basketball Federation) Real Madrid	1 May 2024	13 (**1967**, 1993, **1995**, 1996, 2011, 2013, 2014, **2015**, 2017, **2018**, 2019, 2022, **2023**)
(Hellenic Basketball Federation) Olympiacos	8 May 2024	12 (1994, 1995, **1997**, 1999, 2009, 2010, **2012**, **2013**, 2015, 2017, 2022, 2023)
(Hellenic Basketball Federation) Panathinaikos	7 May 2024	11 (1994, 1995, **1996**, **2000**, 2001, **2002**, 2005, **2007**, **2009**, **2011**, 2012)
(Turkish Basketball Federation) Fenerbahçe Beko	8 May 2024	5 (2015, 2016, **2017**, 2018, 2019)

== Bracket ==
Semifinals
24 May
**(Spanish Basketball Federation) Real Madrid**	**87**
(Hellenic Basketball Federation) Olympiacos	76
24 May
**(Hellenic Basketball Federation) Panathinaikos**	**73**
(Turkish Basketball Federation) Fenerbahçe Beko	57

Championship game
26 May
(Spanish Basketball Federation) Real Madrid	80
**(Hellenic Basketball Federation) Panathinaikos**	**95**
Third place game
26 May
**(Hellenic Basketball Federation) Olympiacos**	**87**
(Turkish Basketball Federation) Fenerbahçe Beko	84

== Semifinals ==
=== Semifinal A ===
24 May 2024	**Real Madrid** (Spanish Basketball Federation)	**87**–76	(Hellenic Basketball Federation) Olympiacos	Berlin, Germany
21:15 (CEST) (Note: Originally scheduled for 21:00 CEST, the start of the game was delayed due to the earlier semifinal finishing later because of its own delayed start, the reason for it being security measures regarding fan incidents outside of the arena.)	Scoring by quarter: **28**–10, **28**–27, 15–**21**, 16–**18**
	Pts: Musa 20; Rebs: Hezonja 6 Asts: Campazzo 9 PIR: Musa 23	Boxscore	Pts: Peters 23; Rebs: Peters 10; Asts: Walkup 5 PIR: Peters 26	Arena: Uber Arena; Attendance: 13,578; Referees: (Croatian Basketball Federation) Sreten Radović, (Basketball Federation of Slovenia) Damir Javor, (Turkish Basketball Federation) Emin Moğulkoç

Starters:			Pts	Reb	Ast
PG	7	(Argentina) Facundo Campazzo	3	5	9
SG	31	(Bosnia and Herzegovina) Džanan Musa	20	3	2
SF	11	(Croatia) Mario Hezonja	12	6	0
PF	30	(Senegal) Eli Ndiaye	0	1	0
C	22	(Cape Verde) Edy Tavares	9	4	0
Reserves:					
SG	1	(France) Fabien Causeur	4	1	0
SG	5	(Spain) Rudy Fernández	0	1	1
SF	6	(Spain) Alberto Abalde	0	0	0
PG	13	(Spain) Sergio Rodríguez	8	3	4
C	17	(France) Vincent Poirier	11	3	0
G	23	(Spain) Sergio Llull	9	1	3
PF	28	(France) Guerschon Yabusele	11	2	0
Head coach:
(Spanish Basketball Federation) Chus Mateo

**Real Madrid**	**Olympiacos**

Real Madrid	Statistics	Olympiacos
19/28 (67.9%)	2-pt field goals	12/29 (41.4%)
12/27 (44.4%)	3-pt field goals	14/33 (42.4%)
13/19 (68.4%)	Free throws	10/15 (66.7%)
8	Offensive rebounds	14
23	Defensive rebounds	17
31	Total rebounds	31
19	Assists	15
14	Turnovers	15
8	Steals	9
7	Blocks	1
22	Fouls	22

Starters:			Pts	Reb	Ast
PG	0	(Greece) Thomas Walkup	4	3	5
SG	3	(United States) Isaiah Canaan	7	0	1
SF	16	(Greece) Kostas Papanikolaou	3	3	0
PF	25	(Bosnia and Herzegovina) Alec Peters	23	10	1
C	10	(France) Moustapha Fall	2	6	2
Reserves:					
G	1	(United States) Nigel Williams-Goss	15	4	3
C	2	(United States) Moses Wright	0	0	0
SG	5	(Greece) Giannoulis Larentzakis	DNP		
G	8	(Greece) Naz Mitrou-Long	DNP		
C	30	(Serbia) Filip Petrušev	5	1	0
C	33	(Serbia) Nikola Milutinov	0	0	2
SG	77	(Azerbaijan) Shaquielle McKissic	17	4	1
Head coach:
(Hellenic Basketball Federation) Georgios Bartzokas

=== Semifinal B ===
24 May 2024	**Panathinaikos** (Hellenic Basketball Federation)	**73**–57	(Turkish Basketball Federation) Fenerbahçe Beko	Berlin, Germany
18:26 (CEST) (Note: Originally scheduled for 18:00 CEST, the start of the game was delayed for safety reasons due to fan incidents outside of the arena.)	Scoring by quarter: **22**–13, 16–**23**, **18**–14, **17**–7
	Pts: Lessort 17; Rebs: Lessort 10; Asts: three players 3 PIR: Lessort 20	Boxscore	Pts: Hayes-Davis 14; Rebs: Calathes 9 Asts: Calathes 4 PIR: Hayes-Davis 18	Arena: Uber Arena; Attendance: 13,578; Referees: (Basketball Federation of Serbia) Ilija Belošević, (Spanish Basketball Federation) Carlos Peruga, (French Federation of Basketball) Mehdi Difallah

Starters:			Pts	Reb	Ast
PG	22	(United States) Jerian Grant	13	2	2
SG	25	(United States) Kendrick Nunn	14	4	3
SF	21	(Greece) Ioannis Papapetrou	9	3	2
PF	44	(Greece) Dinos Mitoglou	2	4	0
C	26	(France) Mathias Lessort	17	10	0
Reserves:					
PG	0	(Greece) Panagiotis Kalaitzakis	5	4	0
G	2	(Argentina) Luca Vildoza	DNP		
C	8	(Poland) Aleksander Balcerowski	DNP		
G	10	(Greece) Kostas Sloukas	4	2	3
C	37	(Greece) Kostas Antetokounmpo	0	2	0
SG	40	(Lithuania) Marius Grigonis	6	1	3
PF	41	(Spain) Juancho Hernangómez	3	1	0
Head coach:
(Turkish Basketball Federation) Ergin Ataman

**Panathinaikos**	**Fenerbahçe**

Panathinaikos	Statistics	Fenerbahçe
19/31 (61.3%)	2-pt field goals	11/24 (45.8%)
7/19 (36.8%)	3-pt field goals	9/35 (25.7%)
14/22 (63.6%)	Free throws	8/9 (88.9%)
8	Offensive rebounds	9
29	Defensive rebounds	20
37	Total rebounds	29
13	Assists	14
17	Turnovers	15
8	Steals	6
3	Blocks	0
15	Fouls	21

Starters:			Pts	Reb	Ast
PG	33	(Greece) Nick Calathes	5	9	4
SG	3	(United States) Scottie Wilbekin	2	2	2
SF	21	(Canada) Dyshawn Pierre	0	0	0
PF	11	(United States) Nigel Hayes-Davis	14	4	2
C	0	(United States) Johnathan Motley	0	1	0
Reserves:					
C	5	(Turkey) Sertaç Şanlı	7	2	1
C	9	(Greece) Georgios Papagiannis	3	1	0
SG	13	(Turkey) Tarik Biberović	4	2	2
SF	23	(Serbia) Marko Gudurić	10	2	2
SG	27	(Greece) Tyler Dorsey	2	1	1
PG	41	(Israel) Yam Madar	DNP		
PF	77	(United States) Nate Sestina	10	2	0
Head coach:
(Lithuanian Basketball Federation) Šarūnas Jasikevičius

== Third place game ==
26 May 2024	**Olympiacos** (Hellenic Basketball Federation)	**87**–84	(Turkish Basketball Federation) Fenerbahçe Beko	Berlin, Germany
16:00 (CEST)	Scoring by quarter: **24**–16, **24**–21, 18–**25**, 21–**22**
	Pts: Peters 20; Rebs: Milutinov 8 Asts: Williams-Goss 6 PIR: Peters 21	Boxscore	Pts: Pierre 19; Rebs: Pierre 5 Asts: Wilbekin 5 PIR: Wilbekin 24	Arena: Uber Arena; Attendance: 13,578; Referees: (Croatian Basketball Federation) Sreten Radović, (Spanish Basketball Federation) Carlos Peruga, (Basketball Federation of Serbia) Uroš Nikolić

Starters:			Pts	Reb	Ast
PG	0	(Greece) Thomas Walkup	3	2	2
SG	3	(United States) Isaiah Canaan	8	0	1
SF	16	(Greece) Kostas Papanikolaou	5	3	1
PF	25	(Bosnia and Herzegovina) Alec Peters	20	6	1
C	10	(France) Moustapha Fall	2	5	2
Reserves:					
G	1	(United States) Nigel Williams-Goss	12	2	6
C	2	(United States) Moses Wright	8	7	0
SG	5	(Greece) Giannoulis Larentzakis	10	2	1
G	8	(Greece) Naz Mitrou-Long	0	1	0
C	30	(Serbia) Filip Petrušev	0	2	1
C	33	(Serbia) Nikola Milutinov	10	8	1
SG	77	(Azerbaijan) Shaquielle McKissic	9	1	3
Head coach:
(Hellenic Basketball Federation) Georgios Bartzokas

**Olympiacos**	**Fenerbahçe**

Olympiacos	Statistics	Fenerbahçe
15/37 (40.5%)	2-pt field goals	19/36 (52.8%)
15/23 (65.2%)	3-pt field goals	12/28 (42.9%)
12/17 (70.6%)	Free throws	10/17 (58.8%)
13	Offensive rebounds	11
27	Defensive rebounds	19
40	Total rebounds	30
19	Assists	24
21	Turnovers	11
8	Steals	11
1	Blocks	3
18	Fouls	17

Starters:			Pts	Reb	Ast
PG	33	(Greece) Nick Calathes	3	4	4
SG	3	(United States) Scottie Wilbekin	16	4	5
SF	21	(Canada) Dyshawn Pierre	19	5	3
PF	11	(United States) Nigel Hayes-Davis	3	2	3
C	5	(Turkey) Sertaç Şanlı	11	2	4
Reserves:					
C	0	(United States) Johnathan Motley	7	3	2
SG	2	(Turkey) Şehmus Hazer	0	0	0
C	9	(Greece) Georgios Papagiannis	6	3	0
SF	23	(Serbia) Marko Gudurić	6	1	1
SG	27	(Greece) Tyler Dorsey	5	1	0
PG	41	(Israel) Yam Madar	0	0	2
PF	77	(United States) Nate Sestina	8	4	0
Head coach:
(Lithuanian Basketball Federation) Šarūnas Jasikevičius

== Championship game ==
26 May 2024	Real Madrid (Spanish Basketball Federation)	80–**95**	(Hellenic Basketball Federation) **Panathinaikos**	Berlin, Germany
19:00 (CEST)	Scoring by quarter: **36**–25, 18–**24**, 7–**15**, 19–**31**
	Pts: Musa 15; Rebs: Hezonja 8 Asts: Campazzo, Musa 4 PIR: Musa 19	Boxscore	Pts: Sloukas 24; Rebs: Grant, Lessort 6 Asts: Grant 5 PIR: Sloukas 31	Arena: Uber Arena; Attendance: 13,578; Referees: (Portuguese Basketball Federation) Fernando Rocha, (Basketball Federation of Serbia) Ilija Belošević, (French Federation of Basketball) Mehdi Difallah

Starters:			Pts	Reb	Ast
PG	7	(Argentina) Facundo Campazzo	12	2	4
SG	31	(Bosnia and Herzegovina) Džanan Musa	15	5	4
SF	11	(Croatia) Mario Hezonja	8	8	2
PF	30	(Senegal) Eli Ndiaye	8	1	0
C	22	(Cape Verde) Edy Tavares	4	4	1
Reserves:					
SG	1	(France) Fabien Causeur	2	0	0
SG	5	(Spain) Rudy Fernández	0	1	1
SF	6	(Spain) Alberto Abalde	DNP		
PG	13	(Spain) Sergio Rodríguez	11	2	2
C	17	(France) Vincent Poirier	8	4	2
G	23	(Spain) Sergio Llull	6	0	1
PF	28	(France) Guerschon Yabusele	6	1	0
Head coach:
(Spanish Basketball Federation) Chus Mateo

**Real Madrid**	**Panathinaikos**

Real Madrid	Statistics	Panathinaikos
16/29 (55.2%)	2-pt field goals	18/35 (51.4%)
11/36 (30.6%)	3-pt field goals	12/22 (54.5%)
15/18 (83.3%)	Free throws	23/30 (76.7%)
10	Offensive rebounds	8
21	Defensive rebounds	29
31	Total rebounds	37
17	Assists	13
7	Turnovers	9
6	Steals	3
1	Blocks	0
20	Fouls	24

2023–24 EuroLeague champions

**Panathinaikos AKTOR**
(7th title)

Starters:			Pts	Reb	Ast
PG	22	(United States) Jerian Grant	11	6	5
SG	25	(United States) Kendrick Nunn	21	3	3
SF	21	(Greece) Ioannis Papapetrou	4	1	0
PF	44	(Greece) Dinos Mitoglou	8	3	0
C	26	(France) Mathias Lessort	17	6	1
Reserves:					
PG	0	(Greece) Panagiotis Kalaitzakis	2	2	0
G	2	(Argentina) Luca Vildoza	3	1	0
C	8	(Poland) Aleksander Balcerowski	DNP		
G	10	(Greece) Kostas Sloukas	24	2	3
C	37	(Greece) Kostas Antetokounmpo	0	0	0
SG	40	(Lithuania) Marius Grigonis	0	1	0
PF	41	(Spain) Juancho Hernangómez	5	4	1
Head coach:
(Turkish Basketball Federation) Ergin Ataman

- Team captains (C): (Spain) Sergio Llull (Real Madrid and (Greece) Kostas Sloukas (Panathinaikos)
