= Bojan Radulović =

Bojan Radulović may refer to:

- Bojan Radulović (basketball)
- Bojan Radulović (footballer)
