= Trajkovski =

Trajkovski (Macedonian: Трајковски; feminine: Trajkovska) is a Macedonian surname, it may refer to:

- Aleksandar Trajkovski, Macedonian footballer
- Blagojče Trajkovski, Macedonian handball player
- Bojan Trajkovski, Macedonian basketball player
- Boris Trajkovski, Macedonian politician
- Dejan Trajkovski, Slovenian footballer
- Igor Trajkovski, Macedonian basketball player
- Michael Trajkovski, Macedonian-Australian footballer
- Pece Trajkovski – Brada, Macedonian musician
- Robert Trajkovski, Macedonian-Australian footballer
- Romana Trajkovska, Macedonian footballer
