= Marin Petkov =

Marin Petkov may refer to:

- Marin Petkov (footballer), Bulgarian footballer
- Marin Petkov (basketball), Macedonian basketball player
