= Aleksandar Knjazev =

Macedonian basketball player and coach

Personal information
- Born: September 29, 1939 (age 87)

Career information
- Playing career: 1956–1970
- Coaching career: 1971–1999

Career history

Playing
- 1956–1957: Vardar
- 1957–1970: Rabotnički
- 1969–1970: → Partizan Kavadarci

Coaching
- 1971–1985: Rabotnički
- 1985–1986: MZT Skopje
- 1986–1988: Rabotnički
- 1991–1994: Rabotnički
- 1994–1996: Kočani Delikates
- 1996–1997: MZT Skopje
- 1998–1999: MZT Skopje

Career highlights
- 2× Macedonian League (1993, 1994); 5× Macedonian Cup (1993, 1994, 1995, 1997, 1999)

Aleksandar Knjazev (Macedonian: Александар Књазев) is a Macedonian professional basketball coach and former player. He spent most of his playing career in KK Rabotnički Skopje, and as a team leader he helped its promotion to the First Yugoslav Basketball League in 1964. He was the first coach of the Macedonia national basketball team after the country's independence in 1992.

His son Gjorgji Knjazev was also a basketball player.
