= Petrušev =

Petrušev or Petrushev (Cyrillic: Петрушев) is a Slavic masculine surname; its feminine counterpart is Petruševa or Petrusheva. It may refer to the following notable people:

- Filip Petrušev (born 2000), Serbian basketball player
- Nikolče Petrušev (born 1969), Macedonian basketball shooting guard
