= Marko Milovanović =

Marko Milovanović may refer to:

- Marko Milovanović (footballer, born 1982)
- Marko Milovanović (footballer, born 2003)
- Marko Milovanović (basketball), Macedonian basketball player
