= Borče Domlevski =

Macedonian basketball player

retired player
- Position: Power forward

Personal information
- Born: May 17, 1975 (age 51) Macedonia
- Listed height: 2.01 m (6 ft 7 in)

Career history
- 1997–1998: MZT Skopje
- 1998–2000: Nemetali Ogražden
- 2001–2002: Kumanovo
- 2002–2004: MZT Skopje
- 2004: Polo Trejd

Borče Domlevski (born May 17, 1975) is a Macedonian professional basketball Power forward who last played for Polo Trejd.
