= Slobodan Petrovski =

Macedonian basketball player

Personal information
- Born: 11 February 1970 (age 56) Skopje, SR Macedonia
- Listed height: 1.95 m (6 ft 5 in)

Career information
- Playing career: 1989–2005
- Position: Small forward
- Coaching career: 2009–present

Career history

Playing
- 1989–1990: Rabotnički
- 1990–1995: MZT Skopje
- 1995–1996: Žito Vardar
- 1996–1998: MZT Skopje
- 1998–1999: Vardar
- 1999–2000: Nikol Fert
- 2000: Alumina
- 2000–2002: Nikol Fert
- 2003–2005: Vardar Imperijal

Coaching
- 2009–2010: Vardar Osiguruvanje
- 2011–2012: Torus
- 2013–2014: Strumica
- 2016: Tirana

Slobodan Petrovski (born 11 February 1970) is a Macedonian former professional basketball player who played for MZT Skopje, Žito Vardar, Nikol Fert and Vardar. He was also member of Macedonia national basketball team. Petrovski`s coaching career started in 2009 when he was appointed as head coach of Vardar Osiguruvanje.

His son Luka Petrovski is also a basketball player. He is a member of Rabotnički
