= Miroslav Despotović =

Macedonian basketball player

free agent
- Position: Power forward

Personal information
- Born: January 1, 1983 (age 43) Skopje, Macedonia
- Listed height: 2.00 m (6 ft 7 in)
- Listed weight: 105 kg (231 lb)

Career information
- Playing career: 2003–present

Career history
- 2003–2004: Centar
- 2004–2007: MZT Skopje
- 2007–2009: Vardar
- 2009–2010: Plejmejker Cubus
- 2010–2012: Liria

Miroslav Despotović (born January 1, 1983) is a Macedonian professional basketball Power forward who last played for KK Lirija.
