= Dejan Dimov =

Macedonian basketball player

Personal information
- Born: April 20, 1974 (age 52) Skopje, SR Macedonia, SFR Yugoslavia
- Listed height: 1.95 m (6 ft 5 in)

Career information
- Playing career: 1995–2004
- Position: Small forward / shooting guard

Career history
- 1995–1999: MZT Skopje Aerodrom
- 1999–2000: Nikol Fert
- 2000–2001: Alumina
- 2001–2004: MZT Skopje Aerodrom

Dejan Dimov (born April 20, 1974) is a Macedonian former professional basketball player who played for MZT Skopje Aerodrom.
