= Vojkan Krgović =

Serbian basketball player and coach

Personal information
- Born: August 17, 1967 (age 59) Peć, SR Serbia, SFR Yugoslavia
- Listed height: 2.07 m (6 ft 9 in)

Career information
- Playing career: 1989–2002
- Position: Center
- Coaching career: 2002–present

Career history

Playing
- 1989–1990: Napredak Kruševac
- 1990–1991: Kosovo Polje
- 1994–1995: Mornar Bar
- 1995–1996: Crvena zvezda
- 1996–1997: Vojvodina
- 1997–1998: Budućnost Peć
- 1998: Kraski zidar
- 2000–2001: Time Bar
- 2001: Boys Bar
- 2001–2002: MZT Skopje

Coaching
- 2002–present: Boys Bar (youth)

Vojkan Krgović (born August 17, 1967) is a Serbian professional basketball coach and former player.

== Awards ==
- Kosovo and Metochia Sportsperson of the Year (1993)
