= Milan Medić =

Serbian basketball player

Partizan

Personal information
- Born: 16 March 1961 (age 65) Sombor, PR Serbia, FPR Yugoslavia
- Listed height: 2.04 m (6 ft 8 in)

Career information
- Playing career: 1979–1995
- Position: Center

Career history
- 1979–1982: Partizan
- 1983–1995: MZT Skopje

Career highlights
- 2× Korać Cup (1978, 1979); 2× Yugoslav League (1979, 1981); Yugoslav Cup (1979)
Medals
Men's basketball
Representing Yugoslavia
European Championship for Juniors
Silver medal – second place	1980 Yugoslavia	Team
Bronze medal – third place	1978 Italy	Team

Milan Medić (born 16 March 1961) is a Serbian former basketball player who played for MZT from 1982 until 1995.
