= Vladimir Georgievski =

Macedonian basketball player

Personal information
- Born: October 18, 1982 (age 44) Skopje, SR Macedonia, SFR Yugoslavia
- Listed height: 1.94 m (6 ft 4 in)
- Listed weight: 205 lb (93 kg)
- Position: Small forward

Career history
- 2001–2003: Balkan Steel
- 2003–2004: Vardar
- 2004–2005: MZT Skopje
- 2005–2006: Centar
- 2006–2008: Karpoš Sokoli
- 2008–2009: AMAK SP
- 2009–2011: MZT Skopje
- 2011–2012: Vardar
- 2012–2013: Kumanovo
- 2013–2015: Karpoš Sokoli

Vladimir Georgievski (born October 18, 1982) is a retired Macedonian professional basketball player who last played for Karpoš Sokoli.
