= Nikola Vasilevski =

Macedonian basketball player

MZT Skopje
- Position: Point guard
- League: Macedonian League

Personal information
- Born: August 3, 2003 (age 23) Ohrid, Macedonia
- Listed height: 1.93 m (6 ft 4 in)
- Listed weight: 87 kg (192 lb)

Career information
- Playing career: 2019–present

Career history
- 2019–2021: MZT Skopje
- 2021–2022: MZT Skopje 2
- 2022–2023: Akademija FMP
- 2023–2025: Donji Vakufr
- 2025–2026: TFT
- 2026: Kozuv
- 2026–present: MZT Skopje

Nikola Vasilevski (born August 3, 2003) is a Macedonian professional basketball Point guard who is currently playing for MZT Skopje of the Macedonian First League.

== Professional career ==
On July 20, 2026, he signed a contract with KK MZT Skopje. Previously, he played for TFT, where he made his debut in ABA 2 against Radnički Kragujevac.
