= Bojan Tadić (basketball) =

Serbian basketball player

Personal information
- Born: February 16, 1972 (age 54) Kragujevac, SR Serbia, SFR Yugoslavia
- Listed height: 2.05 m (6 ft 9 in)

Career information
- NBA draft: 1994: undrafted
- Playing career: 1988–2008
- Position: Power forward

Career history
- 1988–1900: Bosna
- 1990–1994: Metalac Valjevo
- 1994–1995: KD Slovan
- 1995–1996: Spartak Subotica
- 1996–1997: Crvena zvezda
- 1997–1998: MZT Skopje
- 1998–1999: Kuşadası Gençlik
- 1999–2000: Maccabi Rishon
- 2000–2001: Vevey Riviera Basket
- 2001–2002: Saint-Étienne Basket
- 2002–2003: Hermine de Nantes Atlantique
- 2003–2004: JDA Dijon Basket
- 2004–2006: Longwy-Rehon
- 2006–2008: Union Basket Chartres Métropole
Medals
Men's basketball
Representing Yugoslavia
European Championship for Cadets
Silver medal – second place	1989 Spain	U16 Team

Bojan Tadić (born February 16, 1972) is a Serbian former professional basketball player.

== International career ==
Tadić was a member of the SFR Yugoslavia national cadet team that won the silver medal at the 1989 European Championship for Cadets in Spain. Over seven tournament games, he averaged 9.8 points per game.
