= Andrej Andonoski =

Macedonian basketball player

MZT Skopje
- Position: Power forward
- League: Macedonian League

Personal information
- Born: 2 April 2002 (age 24) Skopje, Macedonia
- Listed height: 2.01 m (6 ft 7 in)

Career information
- Playing career: 2020–present

Career history
- 2020–2022: MZT Skopje 2
- 2022–present: MZT Skopje

Career highlights
- 4 × Macedonian League champion (2023–2026); 3× Macedonian Cup winner (2023–2025)

Andrej Andonoski (born 2 April 2002) is a Macedonian professional basketball player for MZT Skopje of Macedonian First League.

== Professional career ==
On 28 January 2023, he made his debut in ABA League with Macedonian basketball club MZT Skopje against SC Derby. On 13 October 2023, for 28 minutes he scored 11 points in the victory in ABA League Second Division against Pelister.
