= Damjan Robev =

Macedonian basketball player

Rabotnički
- Position: Shooting guard
- League: Macedonian League

Personal information
- Born: April 10, 1997 (age 29) Skopje, Macedonia
- Listed height: 1.95 m (6 ft 5 in)

Career information
- Playing career: 2016–present

Career history
- 2016–2017: Vardar
- 2017–2018: Gostivar
- 2018–2020: Vardar
- 2020–2021: Kumanovo
- 2021–2024: MZT Skopje
- 2024–present: Rabotnički

Career highlights
- 3× Macedonian League champion (2022, 2023, 2024); 2× Macedonian Cup winner (2023, 2024); Macedonian Cup MVP (2024)

Damjan Robev (born April 10, 1997) is a Macedonian professional basketball player for Rabotnički of Macedonian First League.

== Professional career ==
On 8 August 2017, he signed with Macedonian basketball club Gostivar On October 10, 2023, he scored 9 points, three rebounds and four assists in the game against KK Cedevita Junior.
