= Nikola Karakolev =

Macedonian basketball player

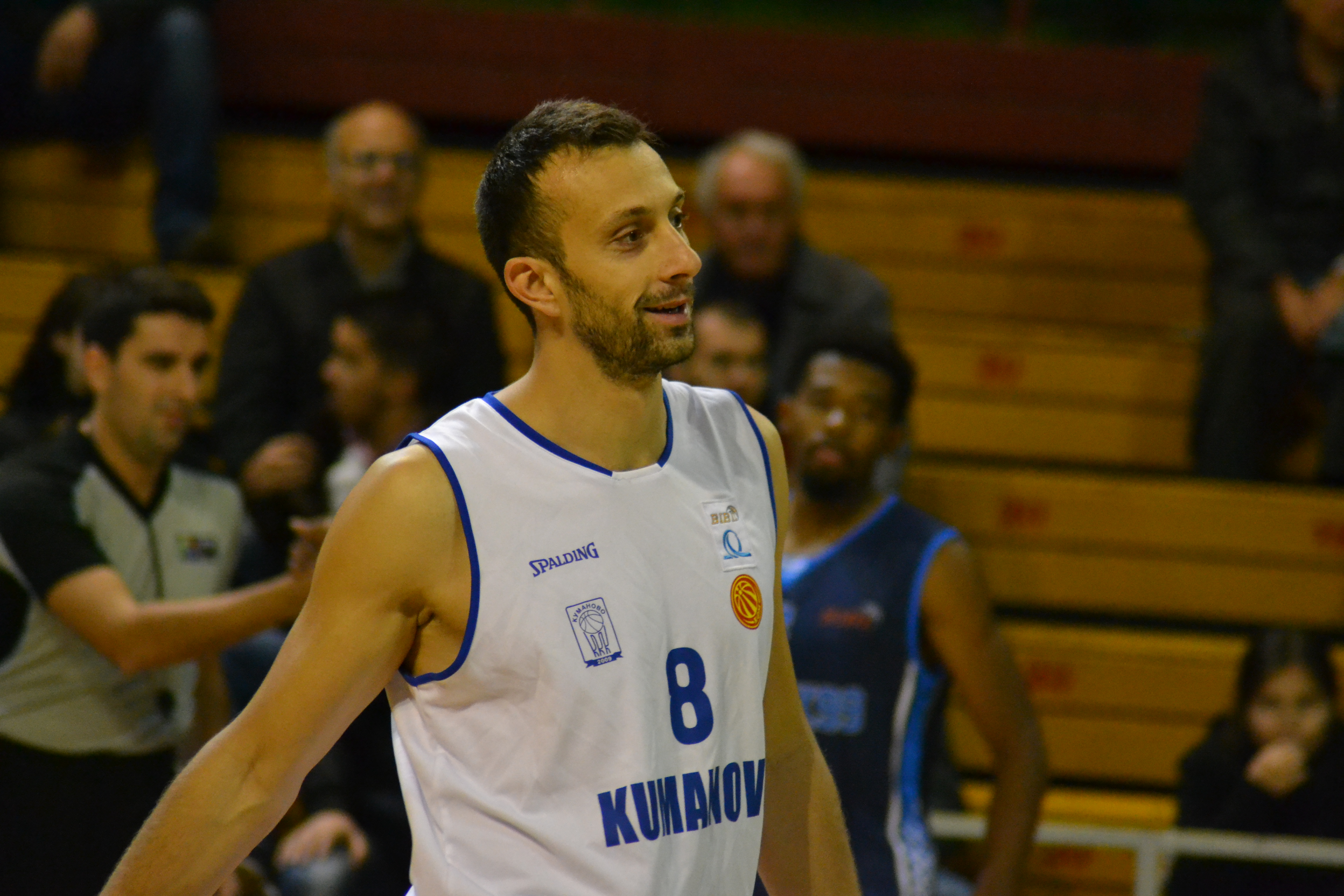

No. 8 – Sokoli 1933 Štip
- Position: Shooting guard
- League: Macedonian Second League

Personal information
- Born: August 24, 1987 (age 39) Štip, Macedonia
- Listed height: 1.97 m (6 ft 6 in)

Career information
- Playing career: 2004–present

Career history
- 2004–2007: MZT Skopje
- 2008–2009: Rabotnički
- 2009–2012: Torus
- 2012–2013: Goce Delčev
- 2013–2014: Lirija
- 2014–2015: Goce Delčev
- 2015: Shkupi
- 2015–2018: Kumanovo
- 2018–2019: Kožuv
- 2019–2024: EuroNickel 2005
- 2024: Kožuv
- 2024–present: Sokoli 1933 Štip

Nikola Karakolev (born August 24, 1987) is a Macedonian professional basketball shooting guard for Sokoli 1933 Štip of the Macedonian Second League.
