= Mack Smith-McEwen =

American basketball player (born 1998)

No. 7 – Tartu Ülikool
- Position: Shooting guard
- League: Korvpalli Meistriliiga; Estonian-Latvian Basketball League

Personal information
- Born: January 28, 1998 (age 28) Indianapolis, Indiana, U.S.
- Listed height: 6 ft 3 in (1.91 m)
- Listed weight: 184 lb (83 kg)

Career information
- High school: Warren Central (Indianapolis, Indiana)
- College: Eastern Illinois (2017–2021); Western Michigan (2021–2022)
- NBA draft: 2022: undrafted
- Playing career: 2022–present

Career history
- 2022–2023: Akademija FMP
- 2023–2024: Euro Nickel
- 2024–2025: Bashkimi
- 2025: Fribourg Olympic
- 2025–2026: MZT Skopje
- 2026–present: Tartu Ülikool

Career highlights
- Macedonian League winner (2026); Macedonian Cup (2026); MVP of Macedonian Cup (2026); Second-team All-OVC (2020); OVC All-Newcomer team (2018)

Mack Thomas Smith-McEwen (born January 28, 1998) is an American professional basketball player for Tartu Ülikool of the Korvpalli Meistriliiga. He played college basketball for the Eastern Illinois Panthers and the Western Michigan Broncos.

== College career ==
As a senior at Western Michigan in 2021–22, Smith-McEwen averaged 7.3 points and 3.4 rebounds in 22.5 minutes in 30 appearances.

== Professional career ==
On September 29, 2025, he signed with MZT Skopje from North Macedonia. On October 7, 2025, he debuted for MZT Skopje against Vršac Meridianbet, scoring 18 points and four rebounds.
