= Emir Krajinić =

Bosnian basketball player

MZT Skopje
- Position: Power forward
- League: Macedonian League

Personal information
- Born: May 9, 2002 (age 24) Zenica, Bosnia and Herzegovina
- Listed height: 6 ft 10 in (2.08 m)

Career information
- Playing career: 2018–present

Career history
- 2018–2024: OKK Sloboda Tuzla
- 2024–2025: Donji Vakuf
- 2025: OKK Sloboda Tuzla
- 2025–2026: Zlatorog Laško
- 2026–present: MZT Skopje

Emir Krajinić (born May 9, 2002) is а Bosnian professional basketball player for MZT Skopje of the Macedonian League.

== Professional career ==
On November 27, 2019, he made his debut for OKK Sloboda Tuzla in ABA League Second Division against Lovćen.. On July 9, 2026, he signed with MZT Skopje.
