= Daniel Milanovski =

Macedonian basketball player

Personal information
- Born: April 4, 1987 (age 39) Macedonia, Yugoslavia
- Listed height: 1.93 m (6 ft 4 in)
- Position: Small forward

Career history
- 2002–2004: MZT Skopje
- 2004–2005: Vardar Linea
- 2006–2007: AMAK SP
- 2007–2008: MZT Skopje
- 2008–2009: Swisslion Pelister
- 2009–2010: Millenium Strumica
- 2010: Vardar 2000
- 2010: ABA Strumica
- 2010: Kumanovo
- 2011–2013: Trepça

Daniel Milanovski (born April 4, 1987) is a former Macedonian professional basketball Small forward.

== Professional career ==
He is a former member of MZT Skopje, Pelister, AMAK SP, Vardar and Strumica.
