= Darnell Lindsay =

American basketball player

Personal information
- Born: August 6, 1987 Lincoln, Illinois, U.S.
- Died: January 4, 2012 (aged 24) Indianapolis, Indiana, U.S.
- Listed height: 6 ft 5 in (1.96 m)

Career information
- High school: Broad Ripple (Indianapolis, Indiana)
- College: Lincoln (Illinois) (2006–2008); Tennessee Tech (2008–2009)
- NBA draft: 2009: undrafted
- Playing career: 2009–2011
- Position: Guard

Career history
- 2009–2010: California HeatWave
- 2010–2011: MZT Skopje

Darnell C. Lindsay (August 6, 1987 – January 4, 2012) was an American professional basketball player. He played college basketball for the Lincoln Lynx and Tennessee Tech Golden Eagles. He was an early entrant in the 2009 NBA draft but was not selected.

Lindsay died on January 4, 2012.
