= Leonid Todorovski =

Macedonian basketball player

BC Shumen
- Position: Center
- League: Bulgarian League

Personal information
- Born: November 5, 1998 (age 28) Macedonia
- Listed height: 2.09 m (6 ft 10 in)

Career information
- Playing career: 2016–present

Career history
- 2016–2019: MZT Skopje Aerodrom
- 2019: Kumanovo
- 2019–2020: MZT Skopje 2
- 2020: Kumanovo
- 2020–present: MZT Skopje 2
- 2021-2022: Akademija FMP
- 2022–present: KK Rabotnički
- 2024-present: KK Kozuv
- 2024-2025: C.B. Cuarte de Huerva
- 2025: Pallacanestro Sora
- 2025-2026: KK Gostivar
- 2026-present: BC Shumen

Career highlights
- Macedonian Cup winner (2018)

Leonid Todorovski (born November 5, 1998) is a Macedonian professional basketball center who currently plays for BC Shumen of the Bulgarian First League.
