= Jane Petrovski =

Basketball player

Personal information
- Born: 9 February 1985 (age 41) Skopje, SR Macedonia, SFR Yugoslavia
- Listed height: 1.81 m (5 ft 11 in)

Career information
- Playing career: 2003–2021
- Position: Guard

Career history
- 2003–2004: Nikol Fert
- 2004: Polo Trejd
- 2004–2008: MZT Skopje Aerodrom
- 2008: Sopron
- 2008–2009: Musson Symferopil
- 2010: Rilski Sportist
- 2010–2011: MZT Skopje Aerodrom
- 2011–2015: Rabotnički
- 2015–2021: EuroNickel 2005

Career highlights
- Macedonian Cup - (2015)

Jane Petrovski (Macedonian: Јане Петровски; born 9 February 1985) is a retired Macedonian professional basketball player who last played for EuroNickel 2005 of the Macedonian First League.

== Macedonian national team ==
Petrovski has also been a member of the Macedonian national basketball team since 2004.

== Achievements ==
- Hungarian League Winner - 2008
- Hungarian Cup Winner - 2008
- Macedonian Cup Winner - 2015
