= Goce Andrevski =

Macedonian basketball player and professor

Personal information
- Born: July 22, 1970 (age 56) Macedonia
- Listed height: 1.91 m (6 ft 3 in)

Career history
- 1991–1994: MZT Skopje
- 1994–1995: Nemetali Ogražden
- 1995–1996: Kočani Delikates
- 1996–1998: Orka Kavadarci
- 1998–2000: Žito Vardar
- 2000–2001: Kumanovo
- 2001–2002: Nikol Fert

Goce Andrevski is an Associated Professor of Strategy at Queen's University and a former Macedonian professional basketball player (point guard) who played for 7 different clubs in the Macedonian Basketball League (Division 1) and in various FIBA-Europe competitions from 1990 to 2001. He play for clubs such as MZT Skopje, Kumanovo and many more.

== Professional career ==
Goce won the Macedonian Cup in 2000–2001 with Nikolfert Gostivar and was runner-up on several occasions for the Macedonian Cup and Macedonian League Championship with MZT Skopje (1991–1994), Kocani Delikates (1995–1996) and Tikves Kavadarci (1996–1997) and Orka Kavadarci (1997–1998).

== Personal life ==
After his basketball career was cut short due to injury, he moved to USA and got his PhD in Strategic Management at the University of Kentucky. He is currently an associate professor of Strategy at Queen's School of Business. He teaches Business and Corporate Strategy at the undergraduate, graduate and MBA level. His research explores how firms can systematically outperform rivals in dynamic competitive environments. His research interests include competitive dynamics, alliance portfolio management, and organizational diversity management. He currently studies managerial strategic decision making in the basketball coaching context.
