= Vedran Morović =

Croatian basketball player

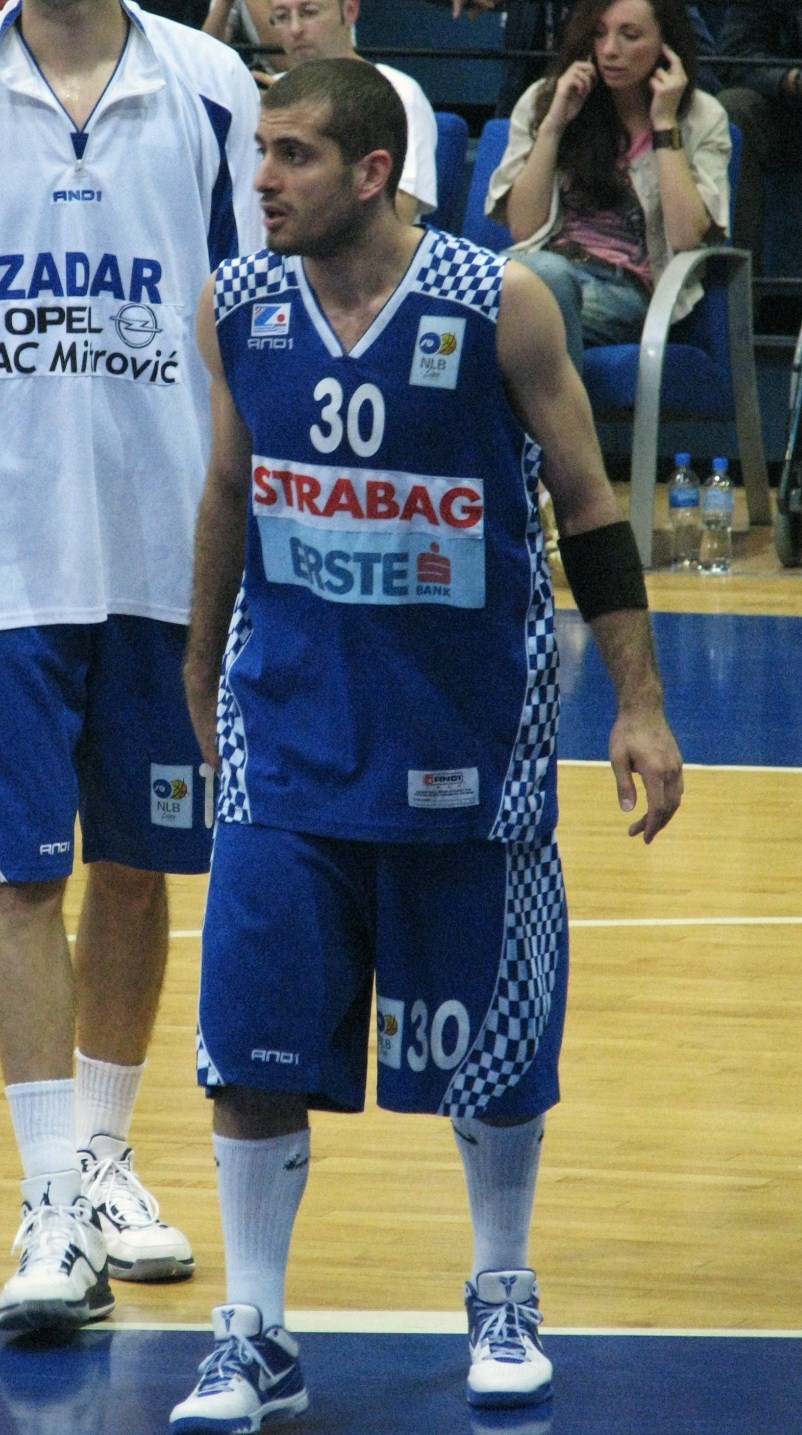

Free agent
- Position: Point guard

Personal information
- Born: July 1, 1983 (age 43) Zadar, SR Croatia, SFR Yugoslavia
- Listed height: 1.83 m (6 ft 0 in)

Career information
- College: Olney CC (2002–2003)
- Playing career: 2000–2014

Career history
- 2000–2002: Zadar
- 2003–2004: Ludwigsburg
- 2004–2005: Cibona
- 2005–2006: Union Olimpija
- 2006: Virtus Bologna
- 2006–2009: Cibona
- 2009–2010: Zadar
- 2010–2011: Široki
- 2011–2012: Politekhnika-Halychyna
- 2012: Zagreb
- 2012–2013: Široki
- 2013: Zadar
- 2013: Peja
- 2014: SO Maritime Boulogne
- 2014: MZT Skopje

Vedran Morović (born July 1, 1983) is a Croatian professional basketball player. He is a 1.83 m high point guard who played last for MZT Skopje.
