= Uroš Vasiljević =

Macedonian basketball player

Free agent
- Position: Small forward

Personal information
- Born: July 8, 1988 (age 38) Skopje, Macedonia
- Listed height: 2.01 m (6 ft 7 in)

Career information
- College: Kenyon (2007–2011)
- NBA draft: 2011: undrafted
- Playing career: 2011–present

Career history
- 2011–2012: Rabotnički
- 2012–2013: KB Vëllaznimi
- 2013: Dubrovnik
- 2013–2014: Vardar
- 2014–2015: Cartagena
- 2015–2016: MZT Skopje

Career highlights
- Macedonian League (2016); Macedonian Cup (2016)

Uroš Vasiljević (born July 8, 1988) is a Macedonian professional basketball player who last played for MZT Skopje of the Macedonian League. Standing at 2.01 metres (6 ft 7 in), he plays the small forward position.
