= Georgi Knjazev =

Macedonian basketball player

Personal information
- Born: May 22, 1971 (age 55) Skopje, SR Macedonia, Yugoslavia
- Listed height: 1.88 m (6 ft 2 in)

Career information
- Playing career: 1990–2005
- Position: Point guard

Career history
- 1990–1993: Godel Rabotnički
- 1993–1995: Kočani Delikates
- 1995–1996: Godel Rabotnički
- 1996–1997: MZT Skopje
- 1997–1998: Godel Rabotnički
- 1998–2000: MZT Boss Skopje
- 2000–2001: Nikol Fert
- 2001: Zob Ahan Isfahan BC
- 2001–2002: Kumanovo
- 2002: Stal Ostrów Wielkopolski
- 2003: Barreirense Basket
- 2003–2005: MZT Skopje 2000

Georgi Knjazev (Macedonian: Георги Књазев, born May 22, 1971) is a Macedonian former professional basketball player who played for many clubs in Macedonia like MZT Skopje, Rabotnički, Kumanovo and many more. He was also member of Macedonia national basketball team. Since 2008 he has been a head coach in the Kuwait Division 1 League, with most of his success coming during his tenure as the head coach of Al Nasar Basketball Club. He is the son of Aleksandar Knjazev, a coach and former player for KK Rabotnički and MZT Skopje.
