= KK MZT Skopje =

MZT Skopje Aerodrom
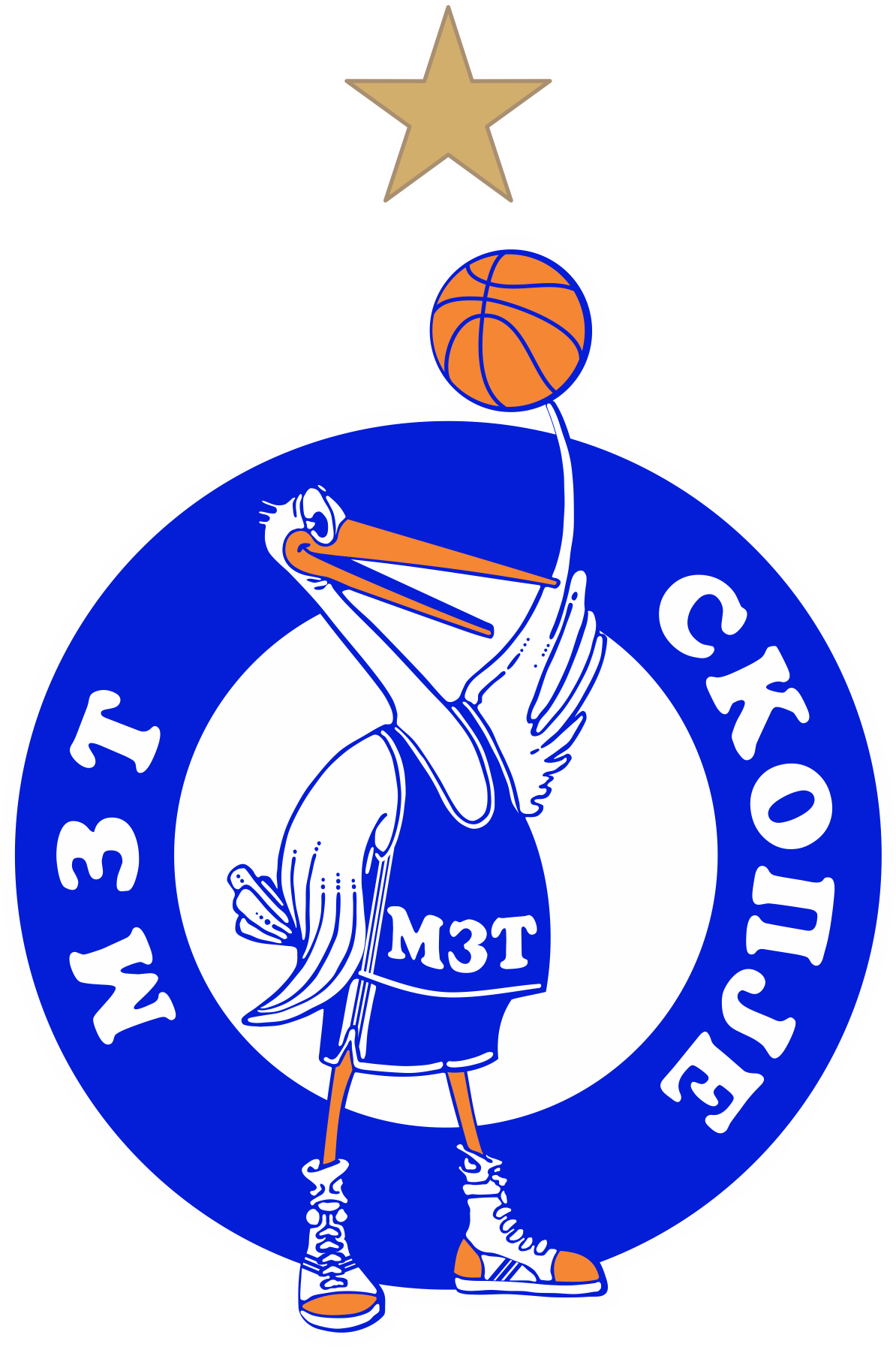
- Nickname: Штркови (The Storks); Металци (The Metalworkers)
- Leagues: ABA 2 Macedonian League; Europe Cup
- Founded: 9 March 1966; 60 years ago
- Arena: Jane Sandanski Arena
- Capacity: 5,850
- Location: Skopje, Macedonia
- Team colors: Blue and White
- President: Nikola Trajčevski
- Team manager: Filip Gjorevski
- Head coach: Dejan Mijatović
- Team captain: Damjan Stojanovski
- Ownership: Aerodrom Municipality
- Affiliation: MZT Skopje 2
- Championships: 13 Championships of Macedonia; 14 Macedonian Cups; 9 Macedonian Super cups
- Website: mztskopjeaerodrom.mk
Home	Away

MZT Skopje Aerodrom (Macedonian: МЗТ Скопје Аеродром) is a professional basketball club based in Skopje, North Macedonia. The club competes in the Macedonian League and ABA League. The club's home ground is Jane Sandanski Arena, but due to small capacity, the matches in the ABA League and EuroCup between 2012 and 2014 were played in Boris Trajkovski Arena. Since the 2014–15 season, all matches are held in the renovated Jane Sandanski Arena.

In its history, MZT Skopje has won the Macedonian championship twelve times, the Macedonian Cup fourteen times, and the Macedonian Super Cup eight times.

The club was a founding member of the Adriatic Basketball Association in 2015. In November 2020, the club's shares were transferred to the Slovenian club KK Koper Primorska.

== History ==
=== Beginnings (1966–1990) ===
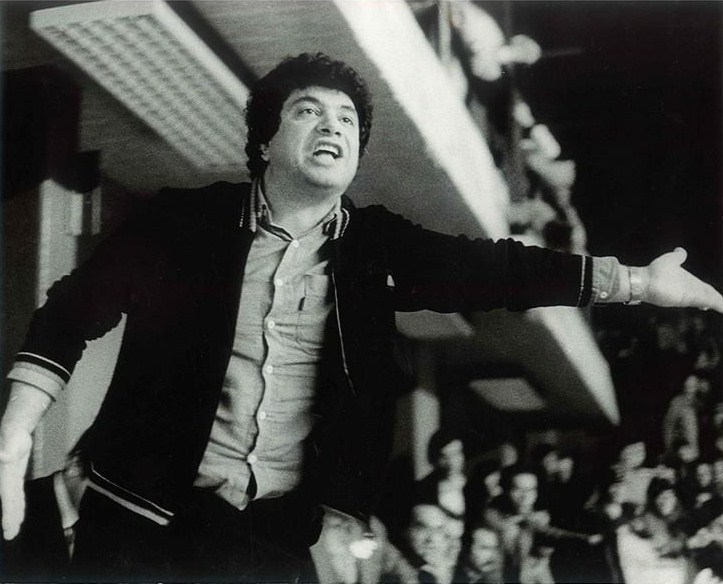
Lazar Lečić was a head coach of MZT in the mid-1980s

KK Skopje was formed in 1966 by a group of enthusiasts led by the club's first president, Mile Melovski. The interest in basketball was high, and even though there were four clubs in Skopje, there was still a need for more clubs. Soon after the club's establishment, a number of young players joined the club and started training on an open field in Avtokomanda. The first team roster consisted of Trpezanovski, Atanasovski, Strezovski, Lazarevski, and Domlevski, who was also the team coach. Two years later, the club became a member of the Macedonian League. In 1971, Uroš Maljković was chosen to be the new president of the club, with Boris Sokolovski becoming the new head coach. After the reorganization of the leagues in Yugoslavia, KK Skopje gained the right to play in the Second League – South. In the first season in this league, KK Skopje finished seventh. In the second season, the team reached the First League qualifications. KK Skopje lost and, due to leaving the field in Ivangrad, received a penalty of eight points for the next season.

KK Skopje got relegated again to the regional league and Taki Dzikov was selected to be the head coach. In 1979, the team finished first in the Macedonian League and gained promotion to the Second Yugoslav League yet again. With this success, the factory Metalski Zavod Tito, or MZT, thanks to Jovo Panajotović, Uroš Maljković, and Slobodan Mucunski, one of the leading people of MZT, who became the president of the club started investing in KK Skopje. In 1984, MZT completely took the club under its wing, building the new Jane Sandanski Arena in Aerodrom. In 1986, KK Skopje, under the new name MZT Skopje and the leadership of Lazar Lečić, reached the Yugoslav First Basketball League where they competed for two seasons.

The team debuted in the Yugoslav First Basketball League in the 1986–87 season with coach Lazar Lečić, who was previously head of their "eternal rivals" Rabotnički. At that period, the most prominent individuals were Vlatko Vladičevski with an average of 16,4 points, Vojislav Zivčević with 15,6 points, and Darko Knežević with 14,5 points. There was also a significant contribution by the former player of Partizan, Milan Medić, and the former player of Crvena zvezda, Aleksandar Milivojša. In the fourth final of the play-off, Cibona eliminated MZT in two games.

=== Independence of Macedonia (1991–2008) ===
After the independence of Macedonia, MZT Skopje immediately became one of the leading basketball clubs in the country. In the mid-1990s, MZT Skopje had a few successful runs in European competitions, the most memorable being the 1996–97 season when the team played in the Raimundo Saporta Cup. In this period, MZT was led by coach Aleksandar Knjazev, and the team defeated Real Madrid, Benfica, and Ratiopharm, and has therefore qualified for the 1/16 finals, without losing one match at home in Jane Sandanski Arena. The draw allocated that MZT Skopje was to play Porto, with the first match to be played at home. The home form continued when MZT Skopje managed to defeat Porto in Jane Sandanski. But the win was not enough, as Porto won at home by a bigger margin, ending MZT Skopje European season. In the Macedonian National Championship, MZT was eliminated by Žito Vardar in the semifinal. In the next few seasons, MZT Skopje had a marginal role in the European cups, playing against teams like Žalgiris, ASVEL, Cholet, Split, and others. In the domestic league, MZT Skopje had a few tries to get to the championship trophy, playing in the play-off finals six times, but the team did not manage to win the championship in this period. However, MZT won four Macedonian Basketball Cups in this period, in 1996, 1997, 1999, and in 2000.

=== Moments of downfall (2008–2011) ===
In 2008, after many years of the poor decision making of the then management of the club, the fans decided to start a boycott in order to change the entire set of the management team of MZT Skopje. In the summer of 2009, the entire management left the club, leaving the club in financial debt. Two weeks before the beginning of the season, MZT Skopje was left without players, coach, youth school, and sponsors. A day before the deadline for application of teams for the current championship, the Family Aerodrom fan group organized a march in order to save the club. As a result, the club was taken over by the Municipality of Aerodrom. Due to the financial problems of the club, it had the worst season since the independence of Macedonia, so MZT Skopje had to play in the play-out to secure its place in the league. MZT succeeded and, therefore, secured the place in the first division for the next season. In the next season, 2010–11, the club got new sponsors, there was a complete reorganization of the management set, and the junior school was reactivated, which had been defunct for eight years. All debts were repaid, and the team succeeded in entering the playoff semifinals, and the finals of the Macedonian Cup.

=== The club's first championship (2011–12) ===
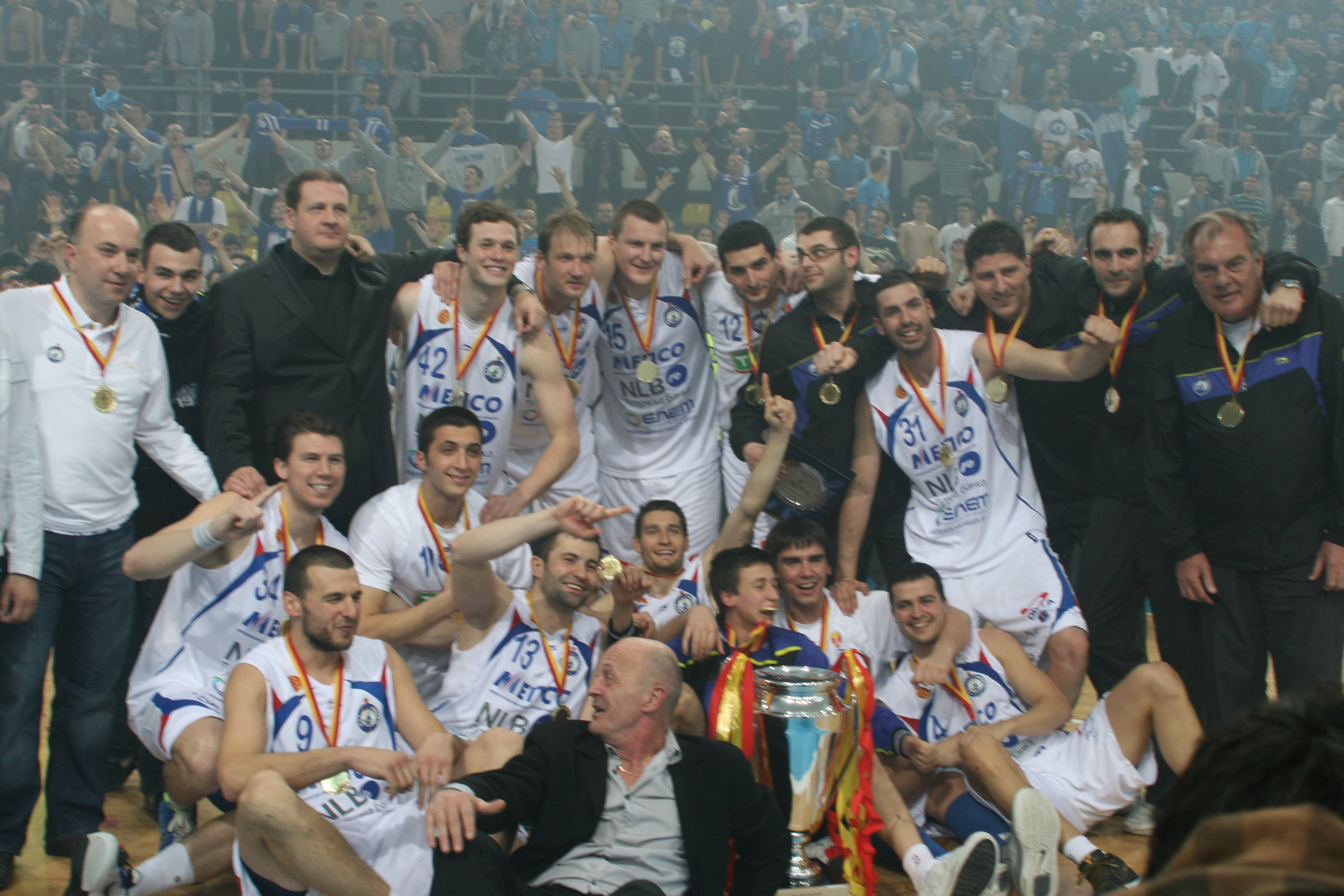
Champions of the 2011/12 season

After all the turmoil and upheavals in the past, after a long time, KK MZT Skopje formed a team which became a favourite for winning the first league title since its existence. Before the start of the season, an agreement has been reached with the ABA League, and the team participated in the 2012–13 ABA League. Aleksandar Todorov, who had previously been on the bench of MZT several times, was appointed as a new coach. Since the last season, the team has included Toni Grnčarov and Igor Penov, while the new signings were Ognen Stojanovski and Gjorgji Čekovski, as well as the foreign players Cade Davis, Noah Dahlman, and Igor Mijajlović. In the regular part of the championship, they won the first place, and the roster was completed with the coming of another player from Montenegro, an international player Nikola Vučurović. The first "exam" for the team was the Macedonian Cup, where the team defeated Feni in the finals at Boris Trajkovski Arena. Feni was also an opponent in the league finals; Aerodrom won the series 4–1 and became the champion of Macedonia on May 2, 2012, for the first time in its history. After the final game in Kavadarci, a big celebration started. At the center of it all were the players of MZT Skopje Aerodrom, standing on top of an open bus as it slowly moved through crowds of supporters. Fans ran beside the bus, trying to get closer to the heroes who had brought glory back to the club. The celebrations lasted for hours without slowing down. Thousands of people gathered shoulder to shoulder, singing long after midnight.

=== Domination in domestic competitions, ABA League, and Eurocup (2012–2018) ===
MZT Aerodrom's debuted in the ABA League in the 2012–13 season. In its first official game in the Adriatic League, MZT won against Cibona in Zagreb, which was immediately followed by its first official victory at home over Široki Breg. In the last round, MZT had a chance to qualify for the Eurocup. It was necessary to defeat Krka in Slovenia, and for Cedevita to be defeated by the Široki Breg. The task was fulfilled by the Macedonian champions, but the qualification did not depend on MZT alone, and eventually MZT ranked seventh, with a score of 14 wins and 12 losses, thus ensuring its participation in the ABA League in the next season. The team has won the Cup of Macedonia, defeating Kumanovo in the finals, while in the league playoffs, MZT Skopje succeeded in making it to the title without a single defeat, achieving victories over Feni in the semifinals with 3–0 and over Kozuv in the finals with 4–0.

The 2013–14 season was historic for MZT and the Macedonian basketball. After a long time, Macedonia had a team which was a part of the group stage in the Eurocup. The newly named coach Vlada Vukoičić, who replaced Aleš Pipan, brought some new players, including Stefan Sinovec, Uroš Lučić, Justin Reynolds, and Macedonian international Aleksandar Kostoski. The team was drawn in the group with UNICS, Banvit, Maccabi Haifa, VEF Riga, and BC Kalev/Cramo. MZT finished in the last place in the group with one win against Cramo at home.

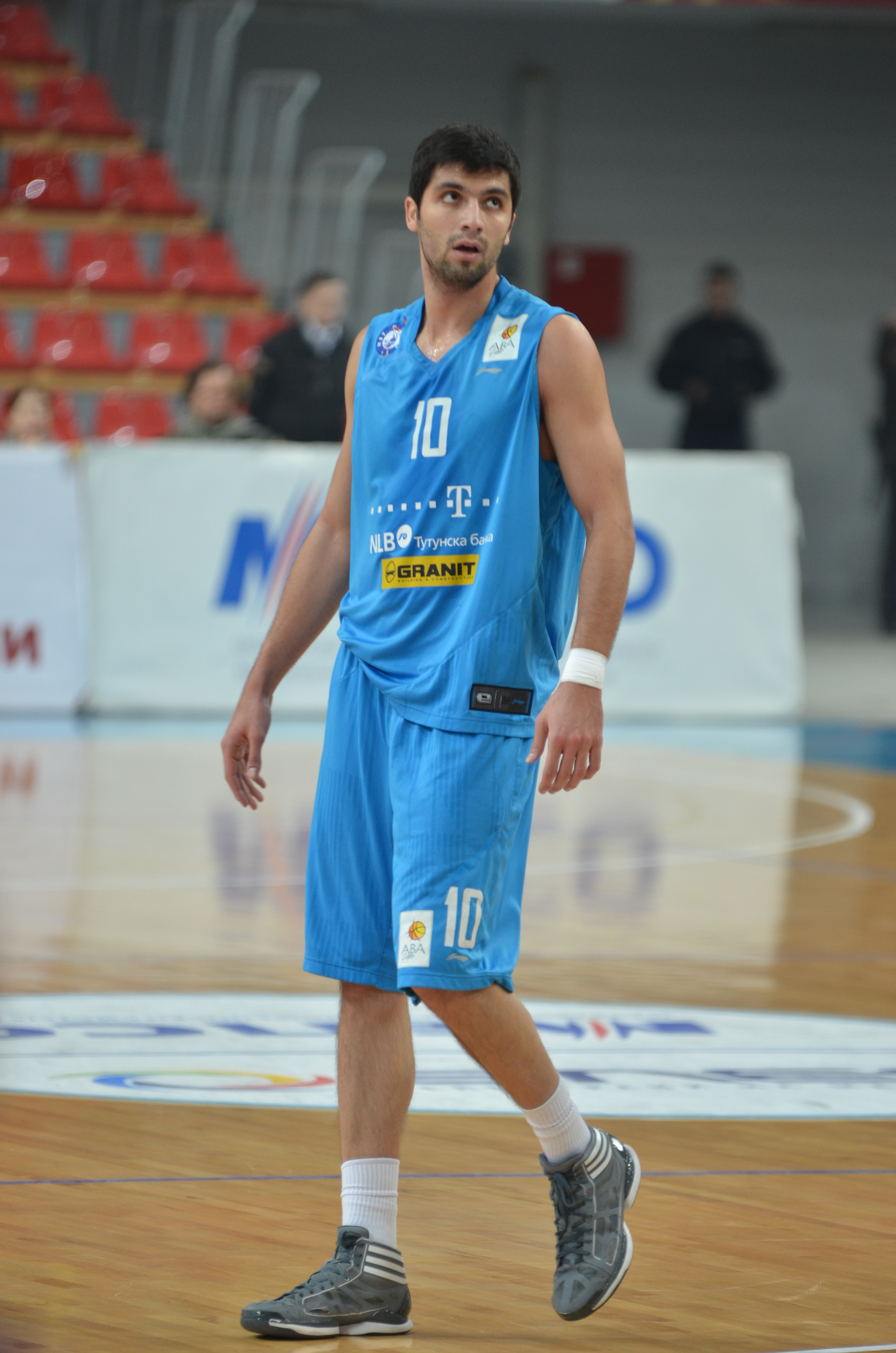
Damjan Stojanovski

Along with the performance in the Eurocup, MZT also competed in the ABA League. MZT appointed Zoran Martić as their new head coach. Instead of desired sixth place in the ABA League, MZT ended the season in ninth place. In February 2014, MZT won the National Cup by defeating Lirija in the final. After that, MZT won ten league games in a row. In the semifinals of the league, the opponents were again Lirija, which MZT eliminated with a score of 2–0 in series. In the final, MZT Skopje defeated "eternal rivals" Rabotnički. The series ended with a 3–1 victory, and MZT won the league for the third season in a row. Prior to the 2014–15 season, many of the players has left the club, and Zmago Sagadin was appointed a new coach. He was sacked shortly after the season began, and was replaced by Vrbica Stefanov. Stefanov was also sacked during the season, and was replaced by Bobi Mitev. Mitev resigned after the series of defeats, and was replaced by Aleksandar Jončevski, who used to be an assistant coach during the mandates of all previous coaches. The elimination from the Macedonian Cup in the semifinals by Kozuv and the next-to-last place in the ABA League meant resignation for Jončevski. He was replaced by Aleš Pipan, who became the fifth coach in the season. In the semifinals of the league, MZT eliminated Feni Industries, while in the finals, the team defeated the Kumanovo team, winning the championship for the fourth time in a row. Aleš Pipan was appointed as a head coach again in the 2015–16 season. After mixed performances in the ABA League regular season, the head coach Aleš Pipan was replaced by Aleksandar Jončevski. MZT ended the ABA League season in the tenth place. In domestic competitions, MZT won another cup and league "double", becoming the champions for the fifth time in a row.

In the 2016–17 season, MZT Skopje applied for participation in the Eurocup for the second time in the last four years. Emil Rajković was appointed as new head coach. After a few games, the coach position was taken up by former assistant Aleksandar Jončevski, but the season ended with Croatian coach Ante Nazor on the bench. The Eurocup campaign ended without a victory out of ten games. In the ABA League, the team defeated Krka in the decisive match in the last part of the season and was thus saved from relegation, finishing in 13th position. The team won their sixth consecutive league title against Karpoš Sokoli 3–2 in the final. Charlon Kloof was MVP of the finals.

MZT Skopje started the 2017–18 season with Aleksandar Todorov as new head coach. However, due to poor results, he was sacked in December 2017. In the same month December 8, 2017, Željko Lukajić was named as the head coach of MZT Skopje. During the season, there were big changes in the club with completely new management, new coach, and changes in the squad. After six years in the First ABA league, MZT got relegated with a score of 3–19. In February 2018, MZT won its nine Macedonian Cup trophy with a win over Rabotnički in the final tournament in Kavadarci. In the meantime Lukajić left the team, and for new head coach was appointed his assistant Gjorgji Kočov. In the Macedonian League MZT finished as the runners-up, losing to Rabotnički in the finals.

=== Seventh domestic title and ABA Second League (2018–19) ===
In the 2018–19 ABA League Second Division, MZT Skopje, coached by Gjorgji Kočov, finished in third place during the regular season. In the play-offs, the club defeated Spars Sarajevo 2–0 to reach the final, where they lost to Sixt Primorska (3–0). The club also lost in the ABA League promotion/relegation play-offs against Zadar (2–1), thus staying in the second division. In the domestic competitions, MZT was eliminated in the semi-finals of the Macedonian Cup against Rabotnički. However, MZT won their seventh domestic championship after defeating Rabotnički 3–0 in the final.

== Name through history ==
The club was established in 1966 as the basketball department of the sports club Skopje. Later the names were changed quite a few times, from KK Skopje (1966–1984), to KK MZT Skopje HEPOS (1984–1992), to KK MZT Skopje (1992–1998), to KK MZT BOSS Skopje (1998–2000), to KK MZT Skopje 2000 (2000–2004), to KK MZT Skopje (2004–2008), to KK MZT FON University (2008–2009), and finally, to KK MZT Skopje Aerodrom (2009–present). Few times in the names of the team were included names of the main sponsors of the team. However, the club is best known under the name KK MZT Skopje.

Names

- KK Skopje (1966–1984)
- KK MZT Skopje HEPOS (1984–1992)
- KK MZT Skopje (1992–1998)
- KK MZT BOSS Skopje (1998–2000)
- KK MZT Skopje 2000 (2000–2004)
- KK MZT Skopje (2004–2008)
- KK MZT FON University (2008–2009)
- KK MZT Skopje Aerodrom (2009–present)

== Honours ==
Honours		No.	Years
League
Macedonian Republic League	Winners	6	1970, 1971, 1972, 1973, 1974, 1979
Macedonian League	Winners	13	2012, 2013, 2014, 2015, 2016, 2017, 2019, 2021, 2022, 2023, 2024, 2025, 2026
Macedonian League	Runners-up	7	1993, 1996, 1998, 1999, 2001, 2004, 2018
Cups
Macedonian Cup	Winners	14	1996, 1997, 1999, 2000, 2012, 2013, 2014, 2016, 2018, 2021, 2023, 2024, 2025, 2026
Macedonian Cup	Runners-up	5	1994, 1995, 2003, 2011, 2022
Macedonian Super Cup	Winners	8	2003, 2015, 2016, 2021, 2022, 2023, 2024, 2025
Macedonian Super Cup	Runners-up	1	2000

== Winning seasons ==
=== Macedonian League ===
Season	Champion	Runner-up	Score	MVP
2011–12	MZT Skopje Aerodrom	Feni Industries	4–1 (seven game series)	(North Macedonia) Todor Gečevski
2012–13	MZT Skopje Aerodrom	Kožuv	4–0 (seven game series)	(North Macedonia) Gjorgji Čekovski
2013–14	MZT Skopje Aerodrom	Rabotnički	3–1 (five game series)	(North Macedonia) Damjan Stojanovski
2014–15	MZT Skopje Aerodrom	Kumanovo	3–0 (five game series)	(North Macedonia) Marko Simonovski – (Montenegro) Sead Šehović
2015–16	MZT Skopje Aerodrom	Kumanovo	3–1 (five game series)	(North Macedonia) Damjan Stojanovski
2016–17	MZT Skopje Aerodrom	Karpoš Sokoli	3–2 (five game series)	(Netherlands) Charlon Kloof
2018–19	MZT Skopje Aerodrom	Rabotnički	3–0 (five game series)	(North Macedonia) Damjan Stojanovski
2020–21	MZT Skopje Aerodrom	EuroNickel 2005	3–0 (five game series)	(North Macedonia) Andrej Magdevski
2021–22	MZT Skopje Aerodrom	Pelister	3–1 (five game series)	(Montenegro) Nemanja Milošević
2022–23	MZT Skopje Aerodrom	Pelister	3–0 (five game series)	(North Macedonia) Vojdan Stojanovski
2023–24	MZT Skopje Aerodrom	Pelister	3–0 (five game series)	(North Macedonia) Damjan Stojanovski
2024-25	MZT Skopje Aerodrom	TFT	3–1 (five game series)	(United States Virgin Islands) Deon Edwin
2025-26	MZT Skopje Aerodrom	Madzari	3–0 (five game series)	(North Macedonia) Vojdan Stojanovski

=== Macedonian Cup ===
Season	Champion	Runner-up	Result	MVP	Host city
1996	MZT Skopje Aerodrom	Godel Rabotnički	69–64	(North Macedonia) Vlatko Vladičevski	Skopje
1997	MZT Skopje Aerodrom	Tikveš Kavadarci	92–86	(North Macedonia) Toni Simić	Radoviš
1999	MZT Skopje Aerodrom	Nikol Fert	78–73	(North Macedonia) Mirza Kurtović	Kavadarci
2000	MZT Skopje Aerodrom	Rabotnički	68–66	(North Macedonia) Gjorgji Knjazev	Skopje
2012	MZT Skopje Aerodrom	Feni Industries	84–66	(North Macedonia) Todor Gečevski	Skopje
2013	MZT Skopje Aerodrom	Kumanovo	79–71	(North Macedonia) Damjan Stojanovski	Skopje
2014	MZT Skopje Aerodrom	Lirija	76–73	(North Macedonia) Todor Gečevski	Ohrid
2016	MZT Skopje Aerodrom	Karpoš Sokoli	68–62	(Serbia) Marko Luković	Gevgelija
2018	MZT Skopje Aerodrom	Rabotnički	76–67	(North Macedonia) Damjan Stojanovski	Kavadarci
2021	MZT Skopje Aerodrom	Rabotnički	77–69	(North Macedonia) Damjan Stojanovski	Skopje
2023	MZT Skopje Aerodrom	Feniks 2010	89–73	(North Macedonia) Vojdan Stojanovski	Skopje
2024	MZT Skopje Aerodrom	Pelister	62–60	(North Macedonia) Damjan Robev	Bitola
2025	MZT Skopje Aerodrom	Kožuv	86–61	(North Macedonia) Andrej Maslinko	Gevgelija
2026	MZT Skopje Aerodrom	Kumanovo	96–70	(United States) Mack Smith-McEwen	Kumanovo

=== Macedonian Super Cup ===
Season	Champion	Runner-up	Result	MVP	Host city
2003	MZT Skopje Aerodrom	Rabotnički	77–75	(North Macedonia) Đorđe Vojnović	Skopje
2015	MZT Skopje Aerodrom	Rabotnički	81–62	(North Macedonia) Dimitar Mirakovski	Ohrid
2016	MZT Skopje Aerodrom	Karpoš Sokoli	87–84	(United States) Torey Thomas	Skopje
2021	MZT Skopje Aerodrom	Rabotnički	79–78	N/A	Skopje
2022	MZT Skopje Aerodrom	TFT	100–82	N/A	Skopje
2023	MZT Skopje Aerodrom	Feniks 2010	76–54	N/A	Skopje
2024	MZT Skopje Aerodrom	Pelister	78–64	N/A	Skopje
2025	MZT Skopje Aerodrom	Kozuv	71–65	N/A	Skopje
2026	MZT Skopje Aerodrom	Kumanovo	70–68	N/A	Kumanovo

== Arena ==
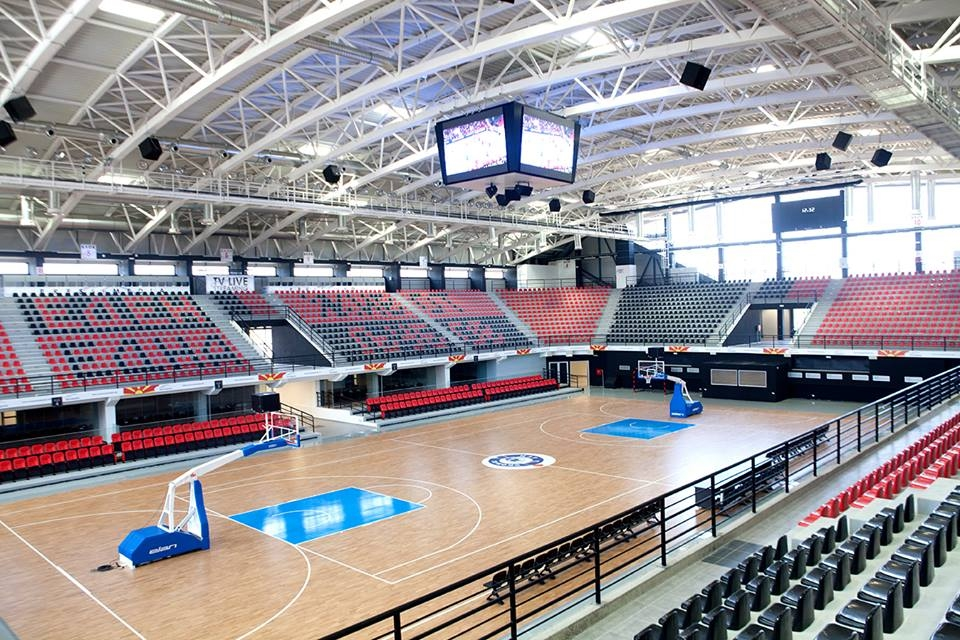
Jane Sandanski Arena

Jane Sandanski Arena is an indoor sports arena located in the Aerodrom Municipality of Skopje, Republic of Macedonia. The arena has a capacity of 5,850. It is named after the Macedonian revolutionary Jane Sandanski.

On 18 November 2012, it was announced that the arena will be completely demolished, with a new arena called Sports Centre Jane Sandanski planned to be built in its stead. On 14 February 2013, MZT Skopje held their last training in Jane Sandanski, with more than a thousand fans attending. The following day, the arena was officially closed and demolished.

In September 2015, west and east stands were upgraded by 500 seats. Now, the arena is home ground of MZT Skopje, RK Vardar, and ŽRK Vardar. Moreover, Sports Centre Jane Sandanski has fitness centre, aerobics centre, tennis and paddle tennis courts, playground for children, and exclusive sports store and fan shop.

== Players ==
=== Current roster ===
Note: Flags indicate national team eligibility at FIBA-sanctioned events. Players may hold other non-FIBA nationalities not displayed.

MZT Skopje roster
Players
Coaches

Pos.	No.	Nat.	Name	Ht.	Wt.	Age
PG	1	(United States)	Farrakhan, Noah	1.88 m (6 ft 2 in)	79 kg (174 lb)	25 – 3 December 2000
SG	3	(North Macedonia)	Stojanovski, Luka	1.90 m (6 ft 3 in)	85 kg (187 lb)	26 – 4 February 2000
PF	6	(North Macedonia)	Andonoski, Andrej	2.00 m (6 ft 7 in)	91 kg (201 lb)	24 – 2 April 2002
PG	7	(North Macedonia)	Vasilevski, Nikola	1.92 m (6 ft 4 in)	87 kg (192 lb)	23 – 3 August 2003
SG	8	(North Macedonia)	Boshaleski, Petar	1.97 m (6 ft 6 in)	88 kg (194 lb)	22 – 8 July 2004
PG	10	(Serbia)	Tadić, Tadija	1.94 m (6 ft 4 in)	88 kg (194 lb)	27 – 22 April 1999
G/F	11	(United States)	Varner II, Lesley	2.01 m (6 ft 7 in)	86 kg (190 lb)	28 – 29 April 1998
PF	13	(North Macedonia)	Maslinko, Andrej	2.08 m (6 ft 10 in)	100 kg (220 lb)	29 – 20 May 1997
SF	19	(North Macedonia)	Stojanovski, Damjan (injured) (C)	1.98 m (6 ft 6 in)	88 kg (194 lb)	38 – 9 December 1987
SG	20	(North Macedonia)	Stojanovski, Vojdan	1.95 m (6 ft 5 in)	87 kg (192 lb)	38 – 9 December 1987
C	21	(Bosnia and Herzegovina)	Krajinić, Emir	2.08 m (6 ft 10 in)	103 kg (227 lb)	24 – 9 May 2002
G/F	22	(North Macedonia)	Mekić, Adem	1.97 m (6 ft 6 in)	82 kg (181 lb)	30 – 28 December 1995
PF	24	(Serbia)	Nikolić, Dimitrije	2.11 m (6 ft 11 in)	114 kg (251 lb)	29 – 6 August 1997
SF	77	(North Macedonia)	Velichkovski, Bojan	1.95 m (6 ft 5 in)	79 kg (174 lb)	20 – 7 April 2006

Head coach

- (Serbia) Dejan Mijatović

Assistant coach(es)

- (Serbia) Ivan Drobnjak
- (North Macedonia) Dejan Srbinovski
- (North Macedonia) Tino Danevski

Strength & conditioning coach(es)

- (North Macedonia) Filip Bosilkov

Physiotherapist(s)

- (North Macedonia) Darko Savov
- (North Macedonia) Mihajlo Manoilov

Team manager

- (North Macedonia) Filip Gjorevski

Legend

- (C) Team captain
- (TW) Two-way affiliate player
- Injured

- Roster
Updated: 3 August 2026

=== Depth chart ===
Pos.	Starting 5	Bench 1	Bench 2	Bench 3
C	Andrej Maslinko	Emir Krajinić
PF	Dimitrije Nikolić	Andrej Andonoski
SF	Damjan Stojanovski	Lesley Varner II	Petar Boshaleski	Bojan Velichkovski
SG	Vojdan Stojanovski	Adem Mekić	Luka Stojanovski
PG	Tadija Tadić	Noah Farrakhan	Nikola Vasilevski

=== Second team ===
For the reserves team of MZT Skopje, see MZT Skopje UNI Banka.

=== Squad changes for the 2026–27 season ===
==== In ====
Date	Position	Player	Moving from
8 July 2026	SG	(North Macedonia) Luka Stojanovski	(North Macedonia) Pelister
9 July 2026	C	(Bosnia and Herzegovina) Emir Krajinić	(Slovenia) Zlatorog Laško
18 July 2026	PG	(North Macedonia) Nikola Vasilevski	(North Macedonia) Kožuv
29 July 2026	PG	(United States) Noah Farrakhan	(Slovakia) Komárno
31 July 2026	SF	(United States) Lesley Varner II	(Lithuania) Jonava Hipocredit
4 August 2026	PF	(Serbia) Dimitrije Nikolić	(Romania) CSM Corona Brașov
12 August 2026	SG	(North Macedonia) Petar Boshaleski	(North Macedonia) Tikveš
14 September 2026	PG	(Serbia) Tadija Tadić	(Montenegro) Sutjeska
30 October 2026	SG	(North Macedonia) Adem Mekić	(North Macedonia) Kumanovo

==== Out ====
Date	Position	Player	Moving to
29 July 2026	PG	(United States) Mack Smith-McEwen	(Estonia) Tartu
15 July 2026	PG	(North Macedonia) Marin Petkov	(United States) Ohio Bobcats
6 August 2026	PF	(North Macedonia) Bojan Krstevski	(North Macedonia) Kumanovo
13 October 2026	PF	(United States) L.G. Gill	(Japan) Chiba Jets
TBA	SF	(United States) Elijah McCadden	TBA
21 August 2026	C	(Serbia) Dušan Tanasković	(Serbia) Vojvodina
TBA	F	(United States) Juan Davis	TBA

=== Former players ===
For a list of all notable KK MZT Skopje players, former and current, see Category:KK MZT Skopje players.

== Management ==
Current staff

- Club Owner: Aerodrom Municipality
- General Manager: Filip Gjorevski
- President: Nikola Trajčevski

== Notable players ==
Note: Flags indicate national team eligibility at FIBA-sanctioned events. Players may hold other non-FIBA nationalities not displayed.

Criteria

To appear in this section a player must have either:

- Set a club record or won an individual award while at the club
- Played at least one official international match for their national team at any time
- Played at least one official NBA match at any time.

- (North Macedonia) Damjan Stojanovski
- (North Macedonia) Vojdan Stojanovski
- (North Macedonia) Todor Gečevski
- (North Macedonia) Gjorgji Čekovski
- (North Macedonia) Vrbica Stefanov
- (North Macedonia) Toni Grnčarov
- (North Macedonia) Ognen Stojanovski
- (North Macedonia) Mirza Kurtović
- (North Macedonia) Gjorgji Knjazev
- (North Macedonia) Pero Blaževski
- (North Macedonia) Bojan Krstevski
- (North Macedonia) Predrag Samardziski
- (North Macedonia) Andrej Magdevski
- (North Macedonia) Vlatko Vladičevski
- (North Macedonia) Slobodan Petrovski
- (North Macedonia) Đorđe Vojnović
- (North Macedonia) Kiril Nikolovski
- (North Macedonia) Andrej Maslinko
- (North Macedonia) Adem Mekić
- (North Macedonia) Dimče Gaštarski
- (North Macedonia) Srdjan Stanković
- (North Macedonia) Gjorgji Talevski
- (North Macedonia) Andrej Andonoski
- (North Macedonia) Marko Simonovski
- (North Macedonia) Damjan Robev
- (North Macedonia) Marin Petkov
- (North Macedonia) Jane Petrovski
- (North Macedonia) Marko Milovanović
- (North Macedonia) Kristijan Nikolov
- (The Bahamas) Mark Dean
- (Socialist Federal Republic of Yugoslavia) Milan Medić
- (Socialist Federal Republic of Yugoslavia) Aleksandar Milivojša
- (Socialist Federal Republic of Yugoslavia) Slobodan Mitić
- (Serbia) Nikola Otašević
- (Serbia) Stefan Sinovec
- (Serbia) Đorđe Drenovac
- (Serbia) Igor Mijajlović
- (Serbia) Andrija Bojić
- (Serbia) Danilo Mijatović
- (Serbia) Uroš Luković
- (Serbia) Marko Luković
- (Serbia) Marko Ljubičić
- (Serbia) Uroš Lučić
- (Serbia) Aleksandar Cvetković
- (Serbia) Nemanja Protić
- (Serbia) Strahinja Mićović
- (Serbia) Aleksandar Bursać
- (Serbia) Dušan Tanasković
- (Serbia) Đorđe Milošević
- (Serbia) Duško Bunić
- (Serbia) Ivica Mavrenski
- (Serbia) Bojan Tadić
- (Serbia) Miloš Koprivica
- (United States) Cade Davis
- (United States) Noah Dahlman
- (United States) Femi Olujobi
- (United States) Lester Medford
- (United States) Frazier Johnson
- (United States) Lorenzo Orr
- (United States) Bryant Smith
- (United States) James Woodard
- (United States) Jordon Crawford
- (United States) Juan Davis
- (United States) Abdul-Malik Abu
- (United States) Keandre Cook
- (United States) Dustin Ware
- (United States) Jabarie Hinds
- (United States) Xavier Thames
- (United States) Levy Middlebrooks
- (United States) Eyassu Worku
- (United States) John Gillon
- (United States) Eron Harris
- (United States) Hassani Gravett
- (United States) Mike Caffey
- (United States) Elijah McCadden
- (United States) L.G. Gill
- (United States) Dion Dixon
- (United States) Mack Smith-McEwen
- (Montenegro) Boris Bakić
- (Montenegro) Nikola Vučurović
- (Montenegro) Sead Šehović
- (Montenegro) Radosav Spasojević
- (Montenegro) Nemanja Milošević
- (Montenegro) Nikola Pavličević
- (Croatia) Jure Lalić
- (Croatia) Ive Ivanov
- (Croatia) Marko Baković
- (Croatia) Robert Rikić
- (Croatia) Dominik Mavra
- (Croatia) Ivan Karačić
- (Bosnia and Herzegovina) Haris Delalić
- (Bosnia and Herzegovina) Aleksej Nešović
- (Canada) David Daniels
- (Canada) Owen Klassen
- (Netherlands) Charlon Kloof
- (Slovenia) Aleksandar Ćapin
- (United Kingdom) Daniel Clark
- (Ivory Coast) Solo Diabate
- (South Sudan) (United States) Nuni Omot
- (Bulgaria) Yordan Minchev
- (United States Virgin Islands) Deon Edwin
- (Georgia (country)) Giorgi Tsintsadze

== Head coaches ==
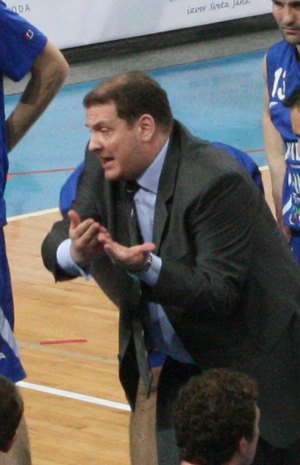
Aleksandar Todorov, the first coach to win the title with MZT.

- (Socialist Republic of Macedonia) Boris Sokolovski
- (Socialist Republic of Macedonia) Aleksandar Domlevski
- (Socialist Republic of Macedonia) Taki Džikov
- (Socialist Republic of Macedonia) Lazar Lečić
- (Socialist Republic of Macedonia) Blagoja Georgievski
- (Socialist Republic of Macedonia) Steruli Andonovski
- (North Macedonia) Aleksandar Todorov
- (North Macedonia) Aleksandar Petrović
- (North Macedonia) Aleksandar Knjazev
- (North Macedonia) Boban Mitev
- (North Macedonia) Janko Lukovski
- (North Macedonia) Marjan Lazovski
- (North Macedonia) Dimitar Manevski
- (North Macedonia) Mitko Lukovski
- (North Macedonia) Vrbica Stefanov
- (North Macedonia) Vasil Kafedžiski
- (North Macedonia) Gjorgji Kočov
- (North Macedonia) Vasko Atanasov
- (North Macedonia) Ante Dukovski
- (North Macedonia) Igor Gacov
- (North Macedonia) Aleksandar Jončevski
- (North Macedonia) Marin Dokuzovski
- (North Macedonia) Emil Rajković
- (North Macedonia) Darko Radulović
- (Serbia) Slobodan Ivković
- (Serbia) Vlada Vukoičić
- (Serbia) Željko Lukajić
- (Serbia) Dragan Nikolić
- (Serbia) Dražen Dalipagić
- (Serbia) Peca Jačimović
- (Montenegro) Miodrag Baletić
- (Slovenia) Aleš Pipan
- (Slovenia) Zoran Martič
- (Slovenia) Zmago Sagadin
- (Croatia) Ante Nazor

== Supporters and rivalry ==
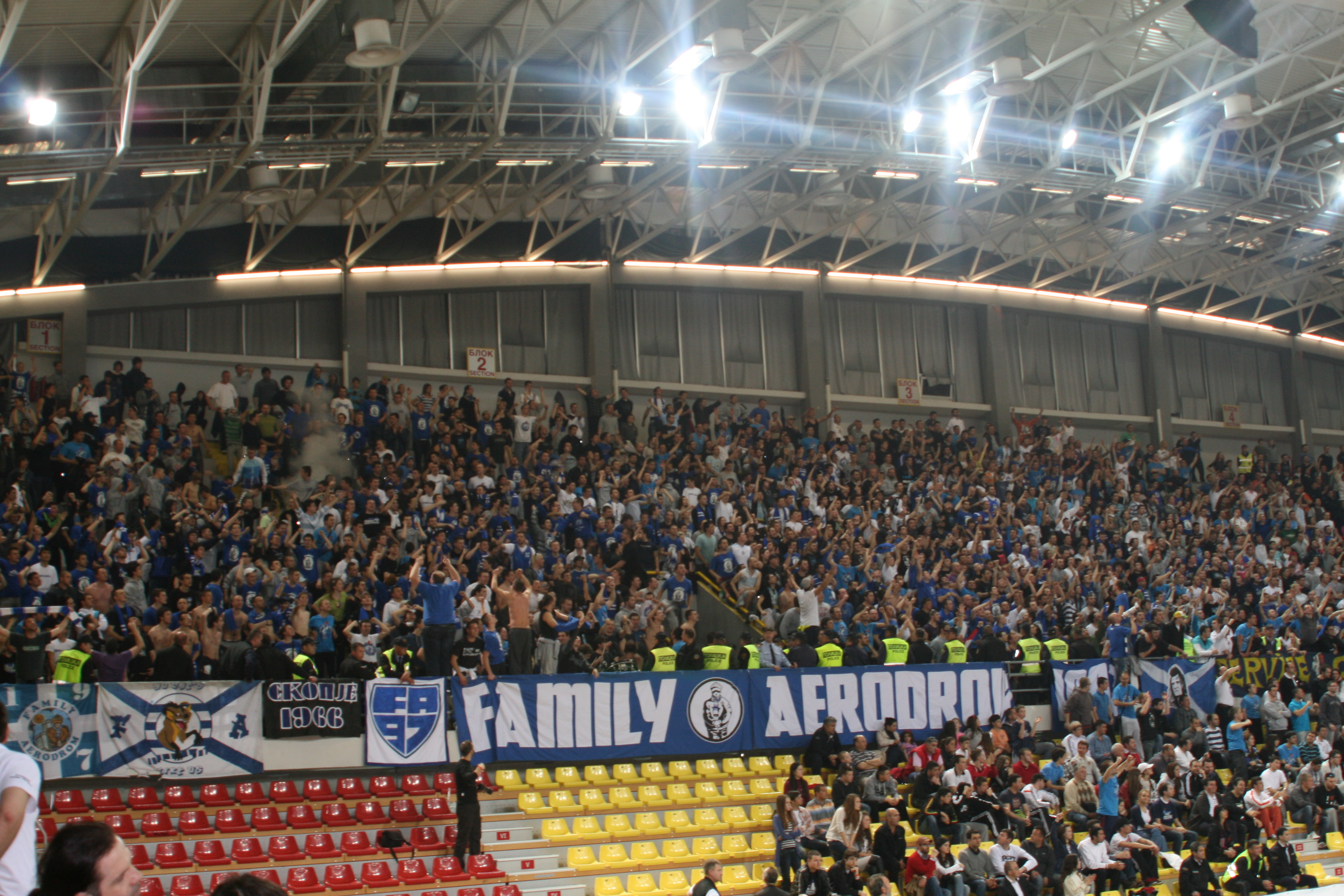
Family Aerodrom at the Cup Final against Feni in 2012

MZT Skopje's fans, Family Aerodrom, were formed in spring 1997.

MZT's fiercest and long-standing city rival is Rabotnički. The rivalry started after the independence of Macedonia, and the matches between these rivals have been labeled as the "Eternal derby." So far are played 175 games and the mutual score is 82 wins for MZT Skopje and 93 for Rabotnički.

== MZT Skopje in European Competitions ==
Win Loss

Korać Cup 1993–94

1st round	(Czech Republic) BK JIP Pardubice	(North Macedonia) MZT Skopje Aerodrom	97–82	111–81
2nd round	(North Macedonia) MZT Skopje Aerodrom	(Germany) Ratiopharm Ulm	75–78	85–70

Raimundo Saporta Cup 1994–95

1st round	(Lithuania) BC Baltai	(North Macedonia) MZT Skopje Aerodrom	60–44	80–74

Korać Cup 1995–96

1st round	(Croatia) Zagreb	(North Macedonia) MZT Skopje Aerodrom	94–80	81–64
2nd round	(North Macedonia) MZT Skopje Aerodrom	(Russia) Arsenal Tula	91–78	94–70

Raimundo Saporta Cup 1996–97

Group stage	(Spain) Real Madrid	(North Macedonia) MZT Skopje Aerodrom	92–65	69–68
Group stage	(Bulgaria) Plama Pleven	(North Macedonia) MZT Skopje Aerodrom	103–94	91–68
Group stage	(North Macedonia) MZT Skopje Aerodrom	(Germany) Ratiopharm Ulm	92–89	94–73
Group stage	(North Macedonia) MZT Skopje Aerodrom	(Israel) Hapoel Galil Elyon	65–55	95–79
Group stage	(Portugal) Benfica	(North Macedonia) MZT Skopje Aerodrom	77–75	75–73
Round of 32	(North Macedonia) MZT Skopje Aerodrom	(Portugal) BC Porto	73–69	80–74

Raimundo Saporta Cup 1997–98

Group stage	(Poland) Znicz Pruszków	(North Macedonia) MZT Skopje Aerodrom	110–64	79–85
Group stage	(North Macedonia) MZT Skopje Aerodrom	(Estonia) BC Tallinna Kalev	81–90	77–54
Group stage	(France) ASVEL Villeurbanne	(North Macedonia) MZT Skopje Aerodrom	68–48	53–58
Group stage	(North Macedonia) MZT Skopje Aerodrom	(Lithuania) Zalgiris Kaunas	93–95	97–49
Group stage	(Croatia) Zagreb	(North Macedonia) MZT Skopje Aerodrom	77–61	52–71

Raimundo Saporta Cup 1998–99

Group stage	(France) Cholet Basket	(North Macedonia) MZT Skopje Aerodrom	90–61	71–86
Group stage	(North Macedonia) MZT Skopje Aerodrom	(Slovakia) Slovakofarma Pezinok	84–76	75–60
Group stage	(Turkey) Türk Telekom B.K.	(North Macedonia) MZT Skopje Aerodrom	75–57	73–81
Group stage	(North Macedonia) MZT Skopje Aerodrom	(Croatia) Split	71–69	85–74
Group stage	(Czech Republic) Geofin Nový Jičín	(North Macedonia) MZT Skopje Aerodrom	94–87	100–74

Korać Cup 2000–01

1st round	(Federal Republic of Yugoslavia) Vojvodina	(North Macedonia) MZT Skopje Aerodrom	93–85	78–81

Eurocup 2013–14

Group stage	(Russia) UNICS Kazan	(North Macedonia) MZT Skopje Aerodrom	85–61	62–88
Group stage	(North Macedonia) MZT Skopje Aerodrom	(Latvia) VEF Riga	70–77	80–71
Group stage	(Israel) Maccabi Haifa	(North Macedonia) MZT Skopje Aerodrom	79–60	83–86
Group stage	(North Macedonia) MZT Skopje Aerodrom	(Estonia) Kalev Cramo	79–70	84–69
Group stage	(Turkey) Banvit	(North Macedonia) MZT Skopje Aerodrom	85–61	68–86

Eurocup 2016–17

Group stage	(Spain) Herbalife Gran Canaria	(North Macedonia) MZT Skopje Aerodrom	87–75	75–98
Group stage	(North Macedonia) MZT Skopje Aerodrom	(Lithuania) Lietkabelis	80–87	90–89
Group stage	(Russia) Nizhny Novgorod	(North Macedonia) MZT Skopje Aerodrom	88–74	82–97
Group stage	(North Macedonia) MZT Skopje Aerodrom	(Croatia) Cedevita	85–89	95–61

== MZT Skopje in ABA League ==
Note: "DNP" indicates that the team did not compete in the league in that season. Win Loss

Season	2012–13		2013–14		2014–15		2015–16		2016–17		2017–18		2022–23	
Score	7th (14–12)		9th (12–14)		13th (7–19)		10th (10–16)		13th (8–18)		14th (3–19)		14th (7–19)	
Team	Home	Away	Home	Away	Home	Away	Home	Away	Home	Away	Home	Away	Home	Away
(Serbia) Borac Čačak	DNP												73–81	105–84
(Montenegro) Budućnost	69–76	81–71	78–71	87–79	65–81	96–69	68–72	65–55	96–90	92–61	71–93	104–62	86–90	89–66
(Croatia) Cedevita	74–61	78–80	75–81	77–67	61–76	81–70	65–70	89–64	79–100	82–61	64–851	77–65	DNP	
(Slovenia) Cedevita O.	DNP												79–74	93–73
(Croatia) Cibona	82–76	72–77	88–93	93–90	78–65	70–61	69–68	68–62	85–89	87–79	76–83	77–92	87–74	87–85
(Serbia) C. Zvezda	60–75	87–72	65–58	87–77	76–79	89–56	66–71	92–79	73–93	91–69	58–92	112–73	57–80	87–67
(Serbia) FMP	DNP								89–68	101–82	67–72	100–72	87–82	101–97
(Bosnia and Herzegovina) Igokea	77–81	79–55	90–82	65–79	76–80	61–76	75–70	70–86	67–71	79–72	68–77	99–108	78–84	96–90
(Slovenia) Krka	92–88	68–80	80–75	73–50	60–72	85–52	69–67	72–68	89–65	97–87	DNP			
(Bulgaria) Levski	DNP				72–61	91–90	DNP							
(Serbia) Mega Leks	DNP		80–72	101–82	84–79	103–95	76–77	82–70	75–74	87–72	76–92	106–77	94–22	93–86
(Serbia) Metalac	DNP				58–64	69–67	93–67	68–77	DNP					
(Montenegro) Mornar Bar	DNP								63–69	65–64	69–72	106–75	77–94	93–84
(Serbia) Partizan	66–64	68–58	69–70	66–73	55–63	65–50	82–78	72–69	62–93	91–76	92–89	112–94	74–92	120–67
(Serbia) Radnički	75–83	89–83	87–95	69–79	DNP									
(North Macedonia) K. Sokoli	DNP								74–71	77–74	DNP			
(Montenegro) SC Derby	DNP												92–79	103–85
(Croatia) Split	73–65	93–84	DNP										80–85	74–77
(Montenegro) Sutjeska	DNP						71–75	68–77	DNP					
(Hungary) Szolnoki	87–53	81–72	73–63	81–69	74–58	73–76	DNP							
(Slovenia) Tajfun	DNP						77–70	68–62	DNP					
(Bosnia and Herzegovina) Široki	63–59	71–72	82–71	67–63	DNP									
(Slovenia) Olimpija	76–87	60–64	79–60	73–62	57–76	69–56	81–62	91–76	97–96	72–91	55–96	94–85	DNP	
(Croatia) Zadar	94–69	68–76	78–69	72–70	72–58	74–69	60–72	84–72	92–65	71–65	80–85	105–80	84–80	98–79

=== Most appearances in ABA League First Division ===
As of 22 May 2023

No	Player	Position	Period	App.
1	(North Macedonia) Damjan Stojanovski	SG	2012–2018; 2022–2023	127
2	(Serbia) Uroš Lučić	PF	2013–2015; 2016	56
3	(North Macedonia) Kiril Nikolovski	C	2012–2015	56
4	(Serbia) Stefan Sinovec	SG	2013–2015; 2016–2017	50
5	(United States) Cade Davis	SF	2012–2014	50

=== Most points in ABA League First Division ===
As of 22 May 2023

No	Player	Position	Period	Pts.
1	(North Macedonia) Damjan Stojanovski	SG	2012–2018; 2022–2023	1287
2	(Serbia) Đorđe Drenovac	SF	2015–2017;	671
3	(North Macedonia) Todor Gečevski	C	2012–2014	622
4	(Croatia) Jure Lalić	C	2016–2018;	524
5	(Serbia) Stefan Sinovec	SG	2013–2015; 2016–2017	523

== Seasons ==
Key

- R1 = First round
- R2 = Second round
- R32 = Round of 32
- R64 = Round of 64
- GS = Group stage
- Players in italics have left the club during the season.

Season	Tier	Domestic league	Pos	Domestic cup	Adriatic League	European competitions	Head coach	Roster
1992–93	1	First League	Runners-up	N/A	—N/a	N/A	Aleksandar Domlevski	Vrbica Stefanov, Milan Medić, Darko Knežević, Slobodan Petrovski, Goce Andrevski, Mirza Kurtović, Toni Simić, Risto Janevski
1993–94	1	First League	Semifinals	Runners-up	—N/a	Korać Cup (R2)	Ante Dukovski	Vrbica Stefanov, Igor Mihajlovski, Slobodan Mitić, Milan Medić, Slobodan Petrovski, Goce Andrevski, Darko Zdravkovski, Mirza Kurtović, Toni Simić, Saša Stanković
1994–95	1	First League	Semifinals	Runners-up	—N/a	European Cup (R1)	Miodrag Baletić	Vrbica Stefanov, Scott Cramer, Vlatko Vladičevski, Marjan Srbinovski, Igor Mihajlovski, Slobodan Mitić, Milan Medić, Risto Janevski, Darko Zdravkovski, Mirza Kurtović, Toni Simić
1995–96	1	First League	Runners-up	Winners	—N/a	Korać Cup (R64)	Lazar Lečić; Dimitar Manevski	Vrbica Stefanov, Rodney Files, Vlatko Vladičevski, Pero Blaževski, Marjan Srbinovski, Mirza Kurtović, Toni Simić, Igor Mihajlovski, Dejan Dimov, Mark Dean, Antonio Minevski, Krste Serafimovski
1996–97	1	First League	Semifinals	Winners	—N/a	EuroCup (R32)	Aleksandar Knjazev	Vrbica Stefanov, Mirza Kurtović, Toni Simić, Gjorgji Knjazev, Pero Blaževski, Mark Dean, Slobodan Petrovski, Igor Mihajlovski, Dejan Dimov, Antonio Minevski, Denis Dervišević, Boris Nešović
1997–98	1	First League	Runners-up	Semifinals	—N/a	EuroCup (GS)	Janko Lukovski; Vasil Kafedžiski	Vrbica Stefanov, Mirza Kurtović, Toni Simić, Bojan Tadić, Dejan Dimov, Slobodan Petrovski, Nikolče Petrušev, Borče Domlevski, Bryant Smith, Nenad Radovski, Denis Dervišević, Ilber Jusufi, Oleg Lebedev, Čedomir Mudreša
1998–99	1	First League	Runners-up	Winners	—N/a	Saporta Cup (GS)	Dražen Dalipagić; Aleksandar Knjazev	Đorđe Vojnović, Gjorgji Knjazev, Mirza Kurtović, Pero Blaževski, Ivica Blagojević, Srdjan Stanković, Dejan Jovanovski, Dejan Dimov, Frazier Johnson, Levy Middlebrooks, Muhamed Tači, Goran Mirčić, Ivica Mavrenski, Nikola Milatović
1999–00	1	First League	Semifinals	Winners	—N/a	—N/a	Mitko Lukovski	Đorđe Vojnović, Gjorgji Knjazev, Dimče Gaštarski, Ivan Gjaković, Ivica Blagojević, Srdjan Stanković, Toni Grnčarov, Nenad Nešović, Risto Nikolov, Erdjan Prešova, Dimitar Simovski, Nikola Gjorgjevski
2000–01	1	First League	Runners-up	Semifinals	—N/a	Korać Cup (R64)	Aleksandar Todorov; Marin Dokuzovski	Đorđe Vojnović, Todor Gečevski, Riste Stefanov, Zlatko Gocevski, Muamer Taletović, Dimče Gaštarski, Mladen Gjuroski, Toni Grnčarov, David Daniels, Dejan Dimov, Marjan Srbinovski, Lorenzo Orr, Srdjan Stanković, Siniša Avramovski, Stojan Madzunkov, Darko Stanimirović, Gjorgji Talevski
2001–02	1	First League	6th place	Semifinals	—N/a	—N/a	Aleksandar Petrović	Đorđe Vojnović, David Daniels, Dejan Dimov, Zlatko Gocevski, Enes Hadžibulić, Marjan Ilievski, Fore Kalpakov, Vojkan Krgović, Nikolče Petrušev, Siniša Avramovski, Zoran Petkovski, Mark Thomas
2002–03	1	First League	Semifinals	Runners-up	—N/a	—N/a	Aleksandar Petrović	Đorđe Vojnović, Dimče Gaštarski, Dejan Dimov, Jovan Zdravevski, Dimitar Karadzovski, Dragan Milenkovič, Siniša Avramovski, Igor Trajkovski, Borče Domlevski, Daniel Milanovski, Ivan Mašović
2003–04	1	First League	Runners-up	Semifinals	—N/a	—N/a	Aleksandar Petrović	Đorđe Vojnović, Gjorgji Knjazev, Gjorgji Talevski, Emil Rajković, Dimče Gaštarski, Dejan Dimov, Jovan Zdravevski, Boris Nešović, Dimitar Karadzovski, Dragan Milenkovič, Daniel Milanovski, Tomče Dišliev, Stojan Madzunkov, Todor Kocev
2004–05	1	First League	Semifinals	Semifinals	—N/a	—N/a	Aleksandar Petrović	Jane Petrovski, Gjorgji Knjazev, Gjorgji Talevski, Nikola Karakolev, Dimče Gaštarski, Miroslav Despotović, Dragan Milenkovič, Igor Penov, Dimitar Karadzovski, Aleksandar Sovkovski, Tomče Dišliev, Kiril Nikolovski, Slobodančo Hadzivasilev
2005–06	1	First League	Semifinals	Quarterfinals	—N/a	—N/a	Aleksandar Petrović	Jane Petrovski, Dragan Milenkovič, Gjorgji Talevski, Nikola Karakolev, Dimče Gaštarski, Miroslav Despotović, Dimitar Simovski, Igor Penov, Aleksandar Šterjov, Mladen Gjuroski, Aleksandar Antić, Erhan Ramadan, Dušan Bosiljanov
2006–07	1	First League	5th place	Quarterfinals	—N/a	—N/a	Aleksandar Petrović	Jane Petrovski, Dragan Milenkovič, Gjorgji Talevski, Nikola Karakolev, Darko Radulović, Dimče Gaštarski, Miroslav Despotović, Igor Penov, Igor Trajkovski, Aleksandar Šterjov, Darjan Hristov, Kiril Nikolovski, Branko Janeski
2007–08	1	First League	Semifinals	Semifinals	—N/a	—N/a	Aleksandar Todorov; Marjan Lazovski	Jane Petrovski, Dragan Milenkovič, Daryll Hill, Srđan Živković, Slobodan Agoč, Kiril Nikolovski, Aleksandar Šterjov, Bojan Atanasoski, Muhamed Tači, Daniel Milanovski, Filip Gjorevski, Edmond Azemi, Florijan Miftari, Nathan Ball, John Smith
2008–09	1	First League	Semifinals	Quarterfinals	—N/a	—N/a	Aleksandar Petrović; Bobi Mitev	Pero Blaževski, Darko Sokolov, Nikola Radojičić, Darko Radulović, Miloš Trailović, Srdjan Stanković, Milorad Damjanac, Dejan Nešovski, Filip Kralevski, Siniša Avramovski, Filip Gjorevski, Angel Tasevski, Edis Nuri, Aleksandar Held, Miloš Pejanović
2009–10	1	First League	Relegation play-out	Quarterfinals	—N/a	—N/a	Ante Dukovski	Miloš Pejanović, Vladimir Georgievski, Gjorgji Talevski, Bogdan Vukadinović, Igor Trajkovski, Nemanja Stanković, Vladan Virijević, Filip Gjorevski, Tomče Dišliev, Tošo Pavlov, Edi Sinadinović, Zoran Milović, Aleksandar Sovkovski, Muhamed Tači, Erhan Ramadan, Miloš Nišavić, Igor Tadić, Mladen Gjuroski
2010–11	1	First League	Semifinals	Runners-up	—N/a	—N/a	Aleksandar Petrović; Peca Jačimović; Budimir Jolović; Igor Gacov	Jane Petrovski, Toni Grnčarov, Nenad Zivčević, Miljan Pupović, Petar Naumoski, Vladimir Veličković, Darnell Lindsay, Zlatko Gocevski, Igor Penov, Kiril Nikolovski, Siniša Avramovski, Gjorgji Kočov, Jovan Teodosić, Vladimir Georgievski, Gjorgji Talevski, Igor Trajkovski, Filip Gjorevski
2011–12	1	First League	Winners	Winners	—N/a	—N/a	Aleksandar Todorov	Todor Gečevski, Gjorgji Čekovski, Ognen Stojanovski, Toni Grnčarov, Cade Davis, Igor Mijajlović, Noah Dahlman, Nikola Vučurović, Igor Penov, Nikola Gajdadziev, Aleksandar Šterjov, Gjorgji Kočov, Riste Stefanov, Chris Grimm, Marjan Janevski, Marcus Kitts
2012–13	1	First League	Winners	Winners	7th	—N/a	Aleksandar Todorov; Aleš Pipan	Damjan Stojanovski, Todor Gečevski, Gjorgji Čekovski, Ognen Stojanovski, Nikola Otašević, Cade Davis, Noah Dahlman, Kiril Nikolovski, Boris Bakić, Gorjan Markovski, Eftim Bogoev, Toni Grnčarov, Igor Mijajlović, Uroš Nikolić, Stefan Popovski-Turanjanin
2013–14	1	First League	Winners	Winners	9th	Eurocup (GS)	Vlada Vukoičić; Zoran Martić	Damjan Stojanovski, Todor Gečevski, Gjorgji Čekovski, Aleksandar Kostoski, Nikola Otašević, Cade Davis, Stefan Sinovec, Sead Šehović, Uroš Lučić, Kiril Nikolovski, Ivan Marinković, Aleksandar Cvetković, Gorjan Markovski, Ognen Stojanovski, Ljubomir Mladenovski, Boban Stajić, Justin Reynolds, Carl Jones
2014–15	1	First League	Winners	Semifinals	13th	—N/a	Zmago Sagadin; Vrbica Stefanov; Bobi Mitev; Aleksandar Jončevski; Aleš Pipan	Damjan Stojanovski, Aleksandar Ćapin, Predrag Samardziski, Marko Simonovski, Stefan Sinovec, Aleksandar Cvetković, Uroš Lučić, Kiril Nikolovski, Sead Šehović, Danilo Mijatović, Ljubomir Mladenovski, Boban Stajić, Adem Mekić, Jourdan DeMuynck, Milton Jennings, Ivan Marinković, Giorgi Tsintsadze, Vedran Morović, Reggie Keely, Owen Klassen, Dion Dixon, Nenad Zivčević, Marko Pajić
2015–16	1	First League	Winners	Winners	10th	—N/a	Aleš Pipan; Aleksandar Jončevski	Damjan Stojanovski, Marko Ljubičić, Đorđe Drenovac, Marko Luković, Uroš Luković, Nemanja Protić, Danilo Mijatović, Duško Bunić, Gorjan Markovski, Ljubomir Mladenovski, Adem Mekić, Uroš Vasiljević, C.J. Carter, Marko Simonovski, Edi Sinadinović
2016–17	1	First League	Winners	Semifinals	13th	EuroCup (GS)	Emil Rajković; Aleksandar Jončevski; Ante Nazor	Charlon Kloof, Xavier Thames, Đorđe Drenovac, Danilo Mijatović, Marko Simonovski, Stefan Sinovec, Jure Lalić, Ljubomir Mladenovski, Adem Mekić, Stojan Gjuroski, Dušan Katnić, Jeremiah Massey, Torey Thomas, Uroš Lučić, Mouloukou Diabate, Andrej Cvetkovski, Devon van Oostrum, Daniel Clark, Josh Scott
2017–18	1	First League	Runners-up	Winners	14th	—N/a	Aleksandar Todorov; Željko Lukajić; Gjorgji Kočov	Damjan Stojanovski, Darko Sokolov, Bojan Trajkovski, Marko Simonovski, Jordon Crawford, Jure Lalić, Radosav Spasojević, Stefan Sinovec, Aleksej Nešović, Andrija Bojić, Igor Penov, Andrej Maslinko, Andrej Nastovski, Leonid Todorovski, Damjan Misa, Daniel Jansen, Brett Bailey, Adem Mekić, Boban Stajić, Eric Garcia, Nikola Pavličević, Dominik Mavra, Yordan Minchev, Đorđe Majstorović
2018–19	1	First League	Winners	Semifinals	ABA 2 Runners-up	—N/a	Gjorgji Kočov	Damjan Stojanovski, Lester Medford, James Woodard, Ive Ivanov, Predrag Samardžiski, Darko Sokolov, Marko Simonovski, Andrija Bojić, Andrej Maslinko, Ljubomir Mladenovski, Andrej Magdevski, Ranko Mamuzić, Mihajlo Mitev, Luka Stojanovski, Viktor Isajloski, Leonid Todorovski, Andrej Nastovski
2019–20	1	First League	COVID-19	COVID-19	COVID-19	—N/a	Gjorgji Kočov	Damjan Stojanovski, Bojan Krstevski, Đorđe Milošević, Femi Olujobi, Eron Harris, Marin Mornar, Andrej Maslinko, Andrej Magdevski, Kristijan Nikolov, Ragip Atar, Jabarie Hinds, Marko Simonovski, Nuni Omot, Bojan Radulović, Ranko Mamuzić
2020–21	1	First League	Winners	Winners	ABA 2 Quarter final	—N/a	Gjorgji Kočov; Darko Radulović	Damjan Stojanovski, Bojan Krstevski, Femi Olujobi, Andrej Magdevski, Adem Mekić, Hassani Gravett, Kristijan Nikolov, Andrija Bojić, Ivan Karačić, Dimitar Ivanov, Filip Bakoč, Toddrick Gotcher, Andrej Maslinko, Frank Turner, Dominez Burnett
2021–22	1	First League	Winners	Runners-up	ABA 2 Runners-up	—N/a	Darko Radulović; Aleksandar Petrović	Damjan Stojanovski, Vojdan Stojanovski, Bojan Krstevski, Adem Mekić, Nemanja Milošević, Brae Ivey, Kristijan Nikolov, Robert Rikić, Juan Davis, Damjan Robev, Dimitar Ivanov, Bojan Velichkovski, Dustin Ware, Sharaud Curry
2022–23	1	First League	Winners	Winners	14th	—N/a	Aleksandar Petrović; Dragan Nikolić; Vasko Atanasov	Damjan Stojanovski, Vojdan Stojanovski, Bojan Krstevski, Damjan Robev, Andrej Andonoski, Dustin Ware, Mike Caffey, Strahinja Mićović, Aleksandar Bursać, Keandre Cook, Abdul-Malik Abu, Dario Mitevski, Dimitar Pandev, Bojan Velichkovski, Andrej Magdevski, Adem Mekić, Samet Yigitoglu, Brea Ivey, Evan Maxwell
2023–24	1	First League	Winners	Winners	ABA 2 Semi-Final	—N/a	Vasko Atanasov	Damjan Stojanovski, Vojdan Stojanovski, Bojan Krstevski, Marko Baković, Dušan Tanasković, Haris Delalić, Damjan Robev, John Gillon, Marin Petkov, Marko Milovanović, Eyassu Worku, Andrej Andonoski, Cedric Russell
2024–25	1	First League	Winners	Winners	ABA 2 Group stage	—N/a	Vasko Atanasov	Damjan Stojanovski, Vojdan Stojanovski, Bojan Krstevski, Andrej Maslinko, Andrej Magdevski, Deon Edwin, Miloš Koprivica, Marin Petkov, Marko Milovanović, Andrej Andonoski, Oliver Dvojakovski, Dimitar Zetov, Bojan Velichkovski, Marko Baković, Brandon Sly
2025–26	1	First League	Winners	Winners	ABA 2 Regular	—N/a	Vasko Atanasov	Damjan Stojanovski, Vojdan Stojanovski, Dušan Tanasković, Marin Petkov, L.G. Gill, Mack Smith-McEwen, Bojan Krstevski, Elijah McCadden, Andrej Maslinko, Juan Davis, Andrej Magdevski, Andrej Andonoski, Oliver Dvojakovski, Bojan Velichkovski
