= Gorjan Markovski =

Gorjan Markovski Горјан Марковски
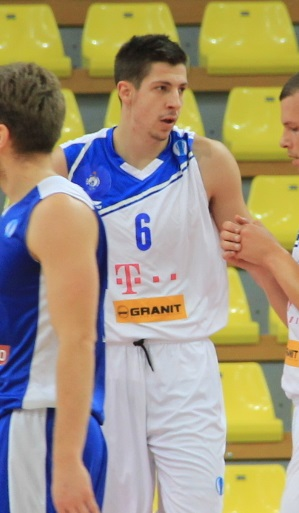
- with MZT in 2013 against Kalev Cramo in Eurocup

Personal information
- Born: June 19, 1992 (age 34) Skopje, Macedonia
- Listed height: 1.96 m (6 ft 5 in)
- Listed weight: 90 kg (198 lb)

Career information
- Playing career: 2008–2024
- Position: Shooting guard

Career history
- 2008–2010: Rabotnički
- 2010–2012: Torus
- 2012–2016: MZT Skopje Aerodrom
- 2016–2019: Feni Industries
- 2019–2021: Kumanovo
- 2021–2023: Rabotnički
- 2023–2024: TFT

Career highlights
- 5× Macedonian League champion (2009, 2013–2016); 3× Macedonian Cup winner (2013, 2014, 2016)

Gorjan Markovski (Macedonian: Горјан Марковски; born June 19, 1992) is a formed Macedonian professional basketball player born in Skopje. of the Macedonian First League. He is 1.96 m (6 ft 5 in) in height and plays at the shooting guard position.

He was a member of U-20 Macedonian national team. His older brother Jovan Markovski is also a basketball player.

== Professional career ==
=== KK Rabotnicki Skopje (2009-2010) ===
Gorjan Markovski started his senior career at KK Rabotnicki Skopje (2009/10) at the age of 17. However, at his early rise he didn't get a greater chance in the club among Darko Sokolov, Enes Hadzibulic and Dimitar Mirakovski. The same year after leaving the U-16 national team he started training with the U-18 national team as a top prospect jet to set his "shine" in basketball.

=== KK Torus Skopje (2010-2012) ===
By establishing a significant role at youth Macedonian national teams Gorjan moves to KK Torus after one year spent with the guys in white and red from "Gradski Park" at the age of 18. Playing among Bojan Trajkovski, Aleksandar Kostovski, Ivica Dimcevski, Gorjan again does not have a significant role at the club. Eventually KK Torus finishes forth on the table heading to the playoffs against the top team KK Feni Industries and ends the 2010/11 season at the semifinals. Markovski extends his contract with the club for the following season, having fewer minutes on the court (5.2ppg, 3.4rpg in the First Macedonian League and 4.6ppg and 2.6rpg in BIBL league), but gaining significant skills ahead of the U-20 European Championship at his last year on the competition. He leads Macedonia with 21.0ppg, 10.8rpg and 1.9apg in seven games.

=== KK MZT Skopje Aerodrom (2012-2016) ===
Although Gorjan had a chance to participate in Europe he stays in Macedonia where he signs for KK MZT Skopje as a top prospect jet to reveal his basketball I.Q. and knowledge as one of the next top Macedonian players. Playing in the Eurocup and ABA league. He finishes the season with 3.3ppg and 1.6rpg in the First League and 1.1ppg and 1.3rpg per game in the ABA league helping the team to win both crowns at home and finish seventh in the ABA league. His minutes on the court improve for the following season (2013–14) averaging 3.1ppg and 2.2rpg in the First league as well as in the ABA league scoring 2.0ppg and 2.1rpg per game. He misses the following season (2014–15) on a leg injury, that will play a big part in the upcoming seasons. Recovered from an injury he struggles the following (2015–16) season, gaining few minutes on the court. At his final season at MZT Skopje his averages count 1.3ppg and 1.2rpg in the ABA League and 3.2ppg, 2.5rpg in the First Macedonian League. With the time spent in MZT Skopje he won four League Championships and three trophies in the Macedonian Cup.

=== KK Feni Industries (2016-2019) ===
Despite having an option to continue the contract with MZT Skopje, Markovski decided to move to Feni Industries and gain a bigger role in the club. On 14 July he signed a two-year deal with the club from Kavadarci.
