= L.G. Gill =

American basketball player (born 1994)

No. 26 – Chiba Jets
- Position: Forward
- League: B.League

Personal information
- Born: December 24, 1994 (age 31) Chesterfield County, Virginia, U.S.
- Listed height: 6 ft 8 in (2.03 m)
- Listed weight: 209 lb (95 kg)

Career information
- High school: Benedictine (Richmond, Virginia)
- College: Duquesne (2013–2016); Maryland (2016–2017)
- NBA draft: 2017: undrafted
- Playing career: 2017–present

Career history
- 2017–2018: Greensboro Swarm
- 2018–2020: Iowa Wolves
- 2020–2021: Golden Eagle Ylli
- 2021–2022: Düzce Belediye
- 2023–2024: Apollon Limassol
- 2024: Soproni KC
- 2024–2025: Tokyo Hachioji Bee Trains
- 2025–2026: MZT Skopje
- 2026–present: Chiba Jets

Career highlights
- Macedonian Cup winner (2026); Kosovo Superleague champion (2021); Liga Unike champion (2021)

Charles Allen Gill Jr. (born December 24, 1994) is an American professional basketball player for the Chiba Jets of the Japanese B.League. He played college basketball for the Duquesne Dukes and the Maryland Terrapins.

== College career ==
As a senior at Maryland in 2016-17, Gill averaged 3.5 points and 2.1 rebounds in 12.7 minutes in 33 appearances.

== Professional career ==
On September 29, 2025, he signed with MZT Skopje from North Macedonia On October 3, 2025, he debuted for MZT Skopje against Madzari, scoring 22 points and sex rebounds.
