= Vlatko Vladičevski =

Macedonian basketball player

Personal information
- Born: Macedonia
- Listed height: 1.92 m (6 ft 4 in)

Career history
- 1986–1990: MZT Skopje
- 1990–1994: Rabotnički
- 1994–1996: MZT Skopje
- 1997–1999: Gostivar

Vlatko Vladičevski is a Macedonian former professional basketball player who played for clubs like MZT Skopje, and Rabotnički.
