= Dragan Milenković =

Macedonian basketball player

Personal information
- Born: May 23, 1984 (age 42) Skopje, Macedonia
- Listed height: 1.98 m (6 ft 6 in)

Career information
- Playing career: 2002–2009
- Position: Shooting guard

Career history

Playing
- 2002–2008: MZT Skopje
- 2008–2009: Karpoš Sokoli

Coaching
- 2016–2017: MZT Skopje (ass.coach)

Dragan Milenkovič (born May 23, 1984) is a Macedonian former professional basketball Shooting guard who played for MZT Skopje and Karpoš Sokoli.
