= Elijah McCadden =

American basketball player (born 1999)

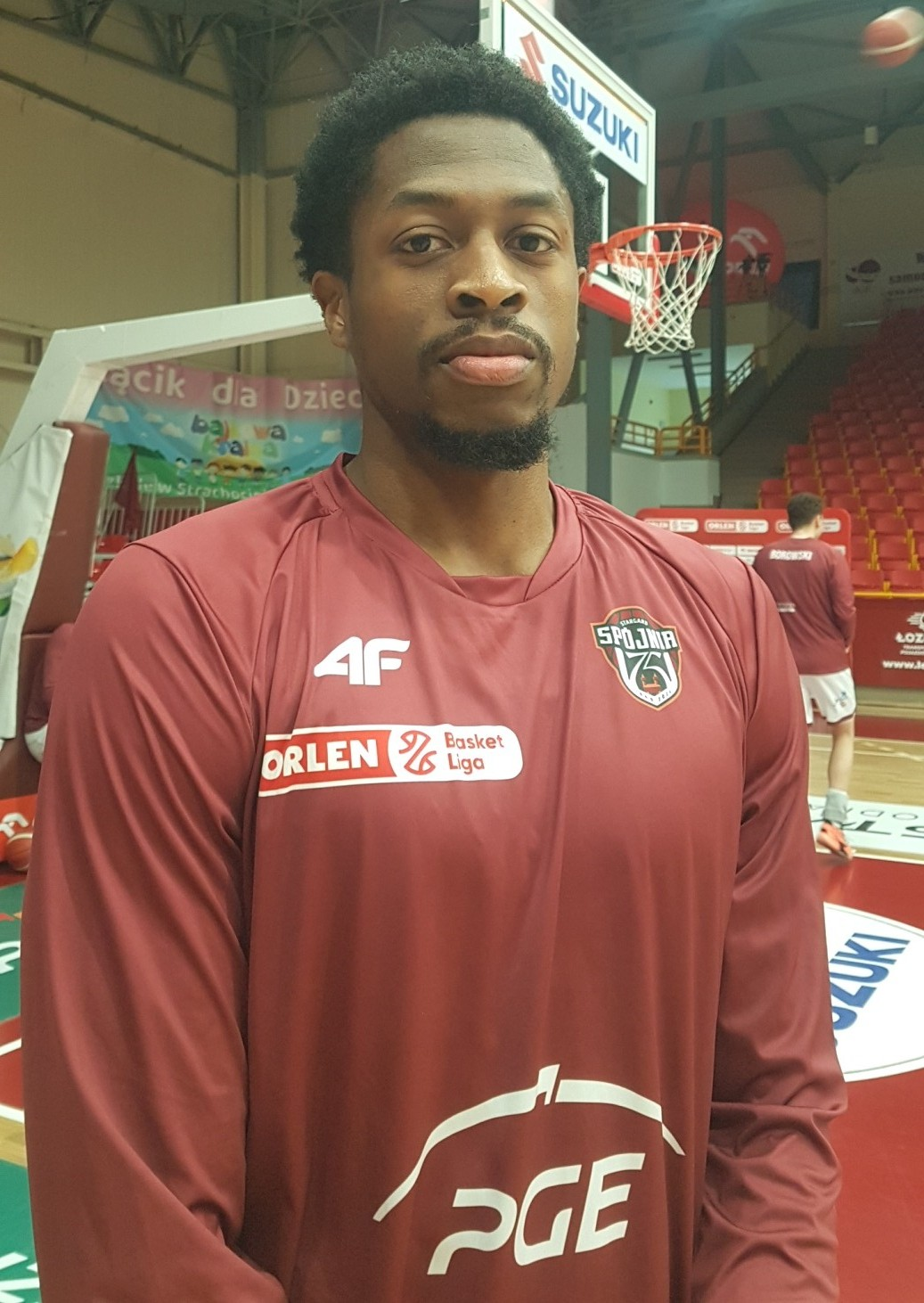

Personal information
- Born: December 20, 1999 (age 26) North Carolina, U.S.
- Listed height: 6 ft 4 in (1.93 m)
- Listed weight: 209 lb (95 kg)

Career information
- College: Georgia Southern (2018–2022); Memphis Tigers (2022–2023)
- Playing career: 2024–present
- Position: Shooting guard

Career history
- 2024: Portimonense
- 2024–2025: Galitos
- 2025: Spójnia Stargard
- 2025–2026: MZT Skopje

Career highlights
- Macedonian League champion (2026); Macedonian Cup winner (2026)

Elijah Lamar McCadden (born December 20, 1999) is an American professional basketball player who last played for MZT Skopje of the Macedonian League. He played college basketball at Georgia Southern Eagles men's basketball from 2018 to 2022 and Memphis Tigers from 2022 to 2023.

== College career ==
As a senior at Memphis in 2022-23, McCadden averaged 7.6 points and 4.1 rebounds in 24.7 minutes in 35 appearances.

== Professional career ==
On August 22, 2025, he signed with MZT Skopje from North Macedonia. On October 7, 2025, he debuted for MZT Skopje against Vršac Meridianbet, scoring 21 points and six rebounds.
