= Frazier Johnson =

American basketball player

Personal information
- Born: July 7, 1970 (age 56) Arkansas
- Died: December 29, 2023
- Listed height: 6 ft 9 in (2.06 m)

Career information
- College: Temple Owls
- Playing career: 1993–2000
- Position: Center

Career history
- 1993–1994: Club Cañadense
- 1994: Long Island Surf
- 1994: B.C. Cossonay
- 1994: Imortal Basket Club
- 1995: Gaiteros del Zulia
- 1995: Long Island Surf
- 1995–1996: PKK Żubry Białystok
- 1996: Atlantic City Surf
- 1996–1997: Olimpija Osijek
- 1997: SSA Unia Tarnow
- 1997: USK Praha
- 1997: Quilmes de Mar del Plata
- 1998: Portugal Telecom
- 1998: Unión Atlética
- 1998: Aibonito Basquet
- 1998–1999: MZT Skopje
- 1999: Saint-Quentin Basket

Frazier Johnson (born July 7, 1970) is a former American professional basketball player who last played for Saint-Quentin Basket.
