= Aleksandar Petrović (basketball, born 1972) =

Macedonian basketball coach

Gostivar
- Position: Head coach
- League: Macedonian First League

Personal information
- Born: February 2, 1972 (age 54)
- Coaching career: 2001–present

Career history

Coaching
- 2001–2007: MZT Skopje
- 2007–2008: Pelister
- 2009–2011: MZT Skopje
- 2013–2015: Karpoš Sokoli
- 2017–2020: Kumanovo
- 2020–2022: Akademija FMP
- 2022: MZT Skopje
- 2024–2026: Pelister
- 2026–present: Gostivar

Career highlights
- Macedonian League champion (2022)

Aleksandar Petrović is a Macedonian professional basketball coach, currently serving as the head coach of Gostivar in the Macedonian First League.
