= Darko Zdravkovski =

Macedonian basketball player

Personal information
- Born: 15 February 1970 (age 56) Skopje, Macedonia
- Listed height: 2.02 m (6 ft 8 in)

Career history
- 1991–1992: Rabotnički
- 1992–1993: Košice
- 1993–1995: MZT Skopje
- 1995–1997: Kumanovo
- 1997–1998: Žito Vardar
- 1998–1999: Orka Kavadarci
- 1999–2001: Vardar

Darko Zdravkovski is a former Macedonian professional basketball Power forward.
