= Igor Penov =

Macedonian basketball player

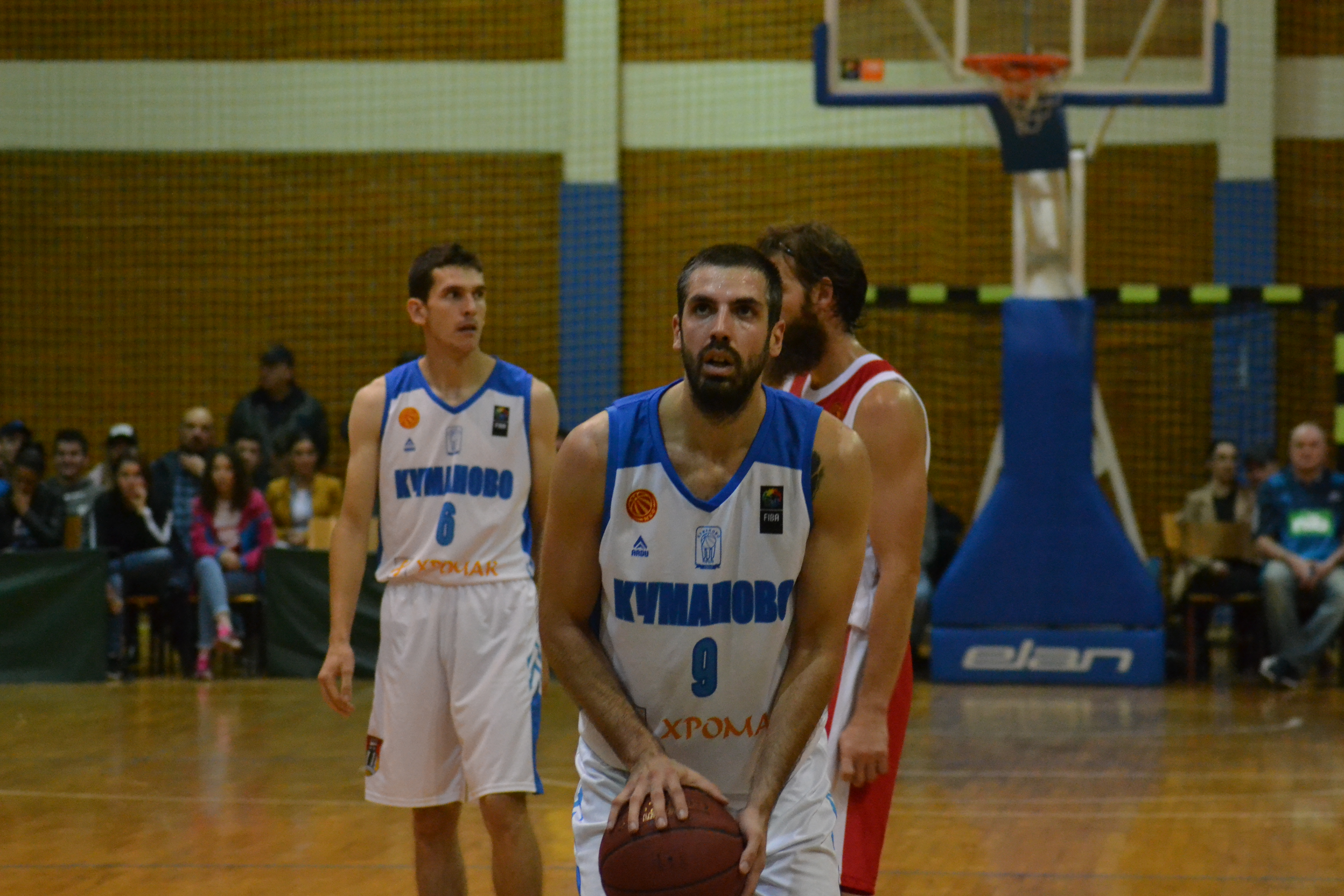
- Igor Penov with MZT in season 2011/2012

Personal information
- Born: October 5, 1984 (age 42) Skopje, SR Macedonia, SFR Yugoslavia
- Listed height: 2.02 m (6 ft 8 in)
- Listed weight: 205 lb (93 kg)
- Position: Small forward

Career history
- 2004–2006: MZT Skopje
- 2006–2008: AMAK SP
- 2008–2010: Vardar Osiguruvanje
- 2010–2012: MZT Skopje
- 2012–2014: Kožuv
- 2014–2017: Karpoš Sokoli
- 2017–2018: MZT Skopje
- 2018–2019: Kumanovo
- 2019: AV Ohrid
- 2019–2020: Pelister

Career highlights
- Macedonian League - (2012); 3x Macedonian Cup (2012), (2017), (2018)

Igor Penov (born October 5, 1984) is a Macedonian professional basketball player who last played for Pelister.
