= Slobodan Mitić =

Serbian basketball player

Personal information
- Born: August 12, 1968 (age 58) SFR Yugoslavia
- Listed height: 2.05 m (6 ft 9 in)
- Listed weight: 120 kg (265 lb)

Career information
- Playing career: 1986–2014
- Position: Center

Career history
- Zdravlje
- Nemetali Ogražden
- MZT
- Vardar
- 2013–2014: Zdravlje

Slobodan Mitić (Serbian Cyrillic: Слободан Митић; born August 12, 1968) is a Serbian former professional basketball player.

He played for Zdravlje, MZT, Nemetali Ogražden and Vardar.
