= Mitko Lukovski =

Macedonian basketball coach

Personal information
- Born: Macedonia
- Position: Coach

Career history
- 1998–1999: Vardar (ass.coach)
- 1999–2000: MZT Skopje
- 2001–2002: MZT Skopje
- 2004–2005: Vardar Linea

Mitko Lukovski (Macedonia) is a former Macedonian basketball coach.
