= Bojan Velichkovski =

Macedonian basketball player

MZT Skopje
- Position: Small forward
- League: Macedonian League

Personal information
- Born: April 7, 2006 (age 20) Skopje, Macedonia
- Listed height: 1.95 m (6 ft 5 in)

Career information
- Playing career: 2021–present

Career history
- 2021–2025: MZT Skopje
- 2026: Angeli
- 2026–present: MZT Skopje

Bojan Velichkovski (born April 7, 2006) is a Macedonian professional basketball player for MZT Skopje of Macedonian First League.

== Professional career ==
On September 15, 2021, he signed for MZT Skopje. On October 1, 2022, he made his debut for MZT in ABA League, in the game against KK Crvena zvezda.
