= Nathan Ball (basketball) =

American basketball player

Personal information
- Born: February 15, 1983 (age 43) Greensboro, North Carolina
- Listed height: 6 ft 9 in (2.06 m)
- Listed weight: 205 lb (93 kg)

Career information
- College: Charleston Southern (2001–2005)
- NBA draft: 2005: undrafted
- Playing career: 2007–2008
- Position: Power forward

Career history
- 2007–2008: MZT Skopje

Nathan Ball (born February 15, 1983) is an American former professional basketball player. He played college basketball for the Charleston Southern Buccaneers.
