= Đorđe Vojnović (basketball) =

Macedonian basketball player

Personal information
- Born: 8 April 1971 (age 55) Skopje, SR Macedonia, SFR Yugoslavia
- Listed height: 1.95 m (6 ft 5 in)

Career information
- Playing career: 1993–2004
- Position: Shooting guard / small forward

Career history
- 1993–1998: Rabotnički
- 1998–2004: MZT Skopje Aerodrom

Đorđe Vojnović (Macedonian: Ѓорѓе Војновиќ, born 8 April 1971) is a retired Macedonian basketball player who played for MZT Skopje Aerodrom and Rabotnički.

== Personal life ==
He is the General manager of Triglav Osiguruvanje in Macedonia.
