= Dejan Srbinovski =

Macedonian basketball player

MZT Skopje
- Title: Assistant coach

Personal information
- Born: February 3, 1997 (age 29) Skopje, Macedonia
- Listed height: 1.86 m (6 ft 1 in)

Career information
- Playing career: 2014–2021
- Position: Assistant coach
- Coaching career: 2021–present

Career history

Playing
- 2010-2011: KK Feniks 2010
- 2014-2018: Vardar
- 2018: Kumanovo
- 2018-2020: FMP Akademija
- 2020-2021: KK Feniks 2010

Coaching
- 2021: KK Feniks
- 2022-present: MZT Skopje (assistant coach)
- 2022-2023: Macedonia U-16 (ass. coach)
- 2023-present: Macedonia U-18 (ass. coach)

Dejan Srbinovski (born February 3, 1997) is a Macedonian professional basketball coach who is currently head coach at MZT Skopje Aerodrom U16 team, assistant coach at MZT Skopje Aerodrom and Macedonian National Team U18. He was assistant coach in Macedonian National Team U16. He started his coaching career at season 2021/22 in KK Feniks 2010 as assistant coach. In his first season as assistant coach he won the national championship 2021/22. He is also a former Macedonian professional basketball player who played for KK Vardar, KK Kumanovo, KK FMP Akademija and KK Feniks 2010.

== Professional career ==
On April 4, 2018, he made his debut for Kumanovo against AV Ohrid. On April 11, 2018, he scored 2 points, 2 rebounds and 2 assists in 83-82 home win against Rabotnički
