= Viktor Isajlovski =

Macedonian basketball player (born 2001)

Viktor Isajloski
MZT Skopje 2
- Position: Forward
- League: Macedonian League

Personal information
- Born: September 28, 2001 (age 25) Macedonia
- Listed height: 2.00 m (6 ft 7 in)

Career information
- Playing career: 2018–present

Career history
- 2018–present: MZT Skopje
- 2019–present: → MZT Skopje 2

Viktor Isajloski (born September 28, 2001) is a Macedonian professional basketball Forward who plays for MZT Skopje 2.

== Professional career ==
On July 19, 2018, he signed his first contract with MZT Skopje.
