= Gjorgji Talevski =

Macedonian basketball player

Personal information
- Born: March 15, 1976 (age 50) Macedonia
- Listed height: 2.03 m (6 ft 8 in)

Career information
- Playing career: 1999–2013

Career history
- 1999–2000: Alumina
- 2000–2001: MZT Skopje
- 2001–2003: Balkan Steel
- 2003–2007: MZT Skopje
- 2007–2010: Swisslion Pelister
- 2010–2011: MZT Skopje
- 2011–2013: Pelister
- 2013: Karpoš Sokoli

Gjorgji Talevski (born 15 March 1976) is a former Macedonian professional basketball Power forward who played for clubs like MZT Aerodrom, and Pelister.
