= Noah Farrakhan =

American basketball player (born 2000)

No. 1 – MZT Skopje
- Position: Point guard
- League: Macedonian League

Personal information
- Born: December 3, 2000 (age 25) Short Hills, New Jersey, U.S.
- Listed height: 6 ft 1 in (1.85 m)
- Listed weight: 169 lb (77 kg)

Career information
- College: East Carolina (2020–2021); Eastern Michigan (2021–2023); West Virginia (2023–2024); Hampton (2024–2025)
- Playing career: 2025–present

Career history
- 2025–2026: Igokea
- 2025: → Student Igokea
- 2026: → Borac Banja Luka
- 2026: Komárno
- 2026–present: MZT Skopje

Noah Ali Farrakhan (born December 3, 2000) is an American professional basketball player for MZT Skopje of the Macedonian League. He played college basketball for the East Carolina Pirates, Eastern Michigan Eagles, West Virginia Mountaineers, and Hampton Pirates.

== College career ==
As a senior at Hampton Pirates in 2024–25, Farrakhan averaged 14.2 points and 2.7 rebounds in 31 appearances.

== Professional career ==
On October 15, 2025, he debuted for Student Igokea against Mornar Bar, scoring 32 points and three assists. On July 29, 2026, he signed with MZT Skopje from North Macedonia.

== Personal life ==
Born in the Short Hills section of Millburn, New Jersey, Farrakhan was raised in Newark, New Jersey and played prep basketball at St. Benedict's Preparatory School before graduating from The Patrick School.
