= Mark Dean (basketball) =

Bahamian basketball player

Personal information
- Born: December 30, 1971 (age 54) Nassau, The Bahamas
- Listed height: 6 ft 9 in (2.06 m)
- Position: Power forward

Career history
- 1995–1997: MZT Skopje
- 1997–1998: SV-Tally Oberelchingen
- 1998–1999: Bnei Herzliya
- 1999–2000: Maccabi Haifa
- 2001: APOEL
- 2001–2002: S.L. Benfica
- 2002–2003: ETHA Engomis
- 2003–2004: Al-Ahli Jeddah
- 2004: Hapoel Tel Aviv
- 2004–2005: Ironi Ashkelon
- 2005–2006: Saint-Étienne Basket

Mark Dean (born December 30, 1971) is a former Bahamian professional basketball player who had eleven-year career in Europe and Israel.
