= Aleksandar Sovkovski =

Macedonian basketball player

Personal information
- Born: January 24, 1981 (age 45) Skopje, SR Macedonia, Yugoslavia
- Listed height: 1.91 m (6 ft 3 in)
- Position: Shooting guard / small forward

Career history
- 1998–1999: Karpoš Sokoli
- 1999–2002: Nikol Fert
- 2002–2005: Vardar
- 2005–2006: Toa Sum Jas
- 2006–2008: Vardar Osiguruvanje
- 2008: KB Peja
- 2008–2009: AMAK SP
- 2009–2010: MZT Skopje
- 2010: Plejmejker Cubus
- 2011–2012: Lirija
- 2012–2014: Vodnjanski Lisici

Aleksandar Sovkovski (born January 24, 1981) is a Macedonian former professional basketball player who last played for Vodnjanski Lisici.
