= Ranko Mamuzić =

Macedonian basketball player (born 1998)

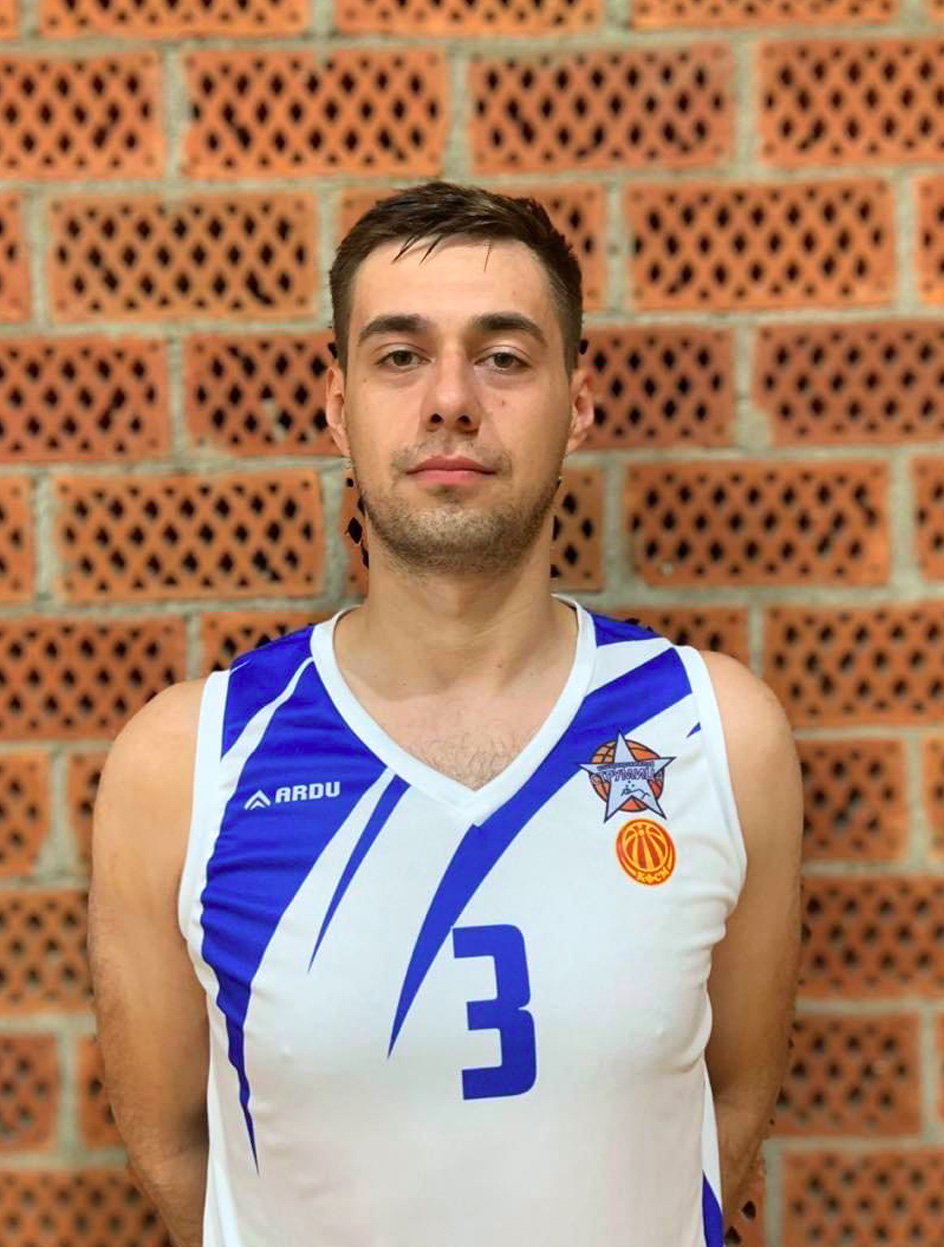

Personal information
- Born: January 30, 1998 (age 28) Kavadarci, Macedonia
- Listed height: 2.03 m (6 ft 8 in)

Career information
- Playing career: 2015–present
- Position: Small forward

Career history
- 2015–2016: L Alfas - P.N. Serra Gelada
- 2016–2017: Basket Alicante
- 2017–2020: MZT Skopje
- 2017–2018: → Kožuv
- 2019–2020: → MZT Skopje Uni Banka
- 2020–2021: EuroNickel 2005
- 2021–2022: Rabotnički
- 2022–2023: Strumica

Career highlights
- Macedonian League champion (2019)

Ranko Mamuzić (born January 30, 1998) is a Macedonian professional basketball Small forward who currently plays for Strumica in the Macedonian First League.
