= Oleg Lebedev (basketball) =

Russian basketball player

Personal information
- Born: February 4, 1971 (age 55) Moscow, Russia
- Listed height: 1.99 m (6 ft 6 in)
- Listed weight: 92 kg (203 lb)

Career information
- Playing career: 1989–present
- Position: Shooting guard / small forward

Career history
- 1989–1992: CSKA Moscow
- 1992–1993: ZTE KK
- 1993-1994: Lokomotiv 91 Usti nad Labem
- 1994-1995: Avtodor Saratov
- 1995-1996: Dinamo Moscow
- 1996-1997: MZT Skopje
- 1997-1998: Maccabi Rehovot Maccabi Lezion
- 1998-1999: Polonia Przemysl
- 1999-2000: Los Barrios Unicaja Malaga

Career highlights
- In season 1989-1990 Champion of the USSR with CSKA Moscow, in season 1991-1992 Champion of Russia with CSKA Moscow in season 1992-1993 Bronze medal in Hungarian Championship with ZTE-HERAKLITH In season 1995-1996 silver medal in Russian championship with Dinamo Moscow, in season 1996-1997 silver medal in Macedonian championship with MZT Skopje in season 2000-2001 winner European wide third tier level FIBA KORAC Cup with Unicaja Malaga

Oleg Lebedev (Russian: Олег Лебедев; born February 4, 1971) is a Russian former professional basketball who last played for Turismo de Merida in Spain.
