= Nikola Radojičić (basketball) =

Serbian basketball player

Personal information
- Born: September 11, 1986 (age 40) Belgrade, SR Serbia, SFR Yugoslavia
- Listed height: 1.96 m (6 ft 5 in)

Career information
- Playing career: 2007–2013
- Position: Guard

Career history
- 2007–2008: Helios Domžale
- 2008: Rapid București
- 2007–2008: OKK Beograd
- 2008–2009: Energy Invest Rustavi
- 2009: MZT Skopje
- 2010–2011: Kumanovo
- 2011: Kasyoun
- 2011–2012: Omonia Nicosia
- 2012–2013: Sluneta Ústí nad Labem
- 2013: Dzukija Alytus

Nikola Radojičić (born September 11, 1986) is a Serbian professional basketball player who last played for Dzukija Alytus of the Lietuvos krepšinio lyga.

On August 14, 2014, has been arrested in Peru because Radojičić swallowed 23 capsules containing 10 grams of cocaine in his stomach.
