= Boris Nešović =

Macedonian basketball player

Personal information
- Born: 7 June 1971 (age 55) Skopje, Macedonia
- Listed height: 1.96 m (6 ft 5 in)

Career information
- Playing career: 1994–2006
- Position: Small forward

Career history
- 1994–1996: Kočani Delikates
- 1996–1997: MZT Skopje
- 1997–1998: Kočani Delikates
- 1998–1999: Kumanovo
- 1999–2001: Rabotnički
- 2001–2003: Polo Trejd
- 2003: Balkan Steel
- 2004–2006: Karpoš Sokoli

Boris Nešović (born 7 June 1971) is a former Macedonian professional basketball small forward who last played for Karpoš Sokoli.
