= Andrej Maslinko =

Macedonian basketball player

MZT Skopje
- Position: Power forward
- League: Macedonian First League

Personal information
- Born: May 20, 1997 (age 29) Skopje, Macedonia
- Listed height: 2.08 m (6 ft 10 in)
- Listed weight: 100 kg (220 lb)

Career information
- Playing career: 2016–present

Career history
- 2016–2017: Rabotnički
- 2017–2021: MZT Skopje
- 2021–2022: TFT
- 2022–2023: Gostivar
- 2023–2024: Pelister
- 2024–present: MZT Skopje

Career highlights
- 3× Macedonian League champion (2019, 2025, 2026); 4× Macedonian Cup winner (2018, 2022, 2025, 2026); Macedonian Cup MVP (2025)

Andrej Maslinko (born May 20, 1997) is a Macedonian professional basketball power forward for MZT Skopje of the Macedonian First League.

== Youth career ==
- 2012-2013: Partizan Vodno Sans U16 team
- 2013-2014: Stella Azzurra Roma (Italy) junior team
- 2014-2015: Stella Azzurra Roma (Italy-Serie B), then moved to Virtus Valmontone (Italy-Serie B)
- 2015-2016: Paffoni Omegna junior team

== Professional career ==
On January 22, 2018, he was in starting five against Crvena zvezda, scoring 15 points and 5 rebounds.
