= Ivica Blagojević =

Macedonian-Serbian basketball player

Personal information
- Born: January 19, 1974 (age 52) SFR Yugoslavia
- Listed height: 2.06 m (6 ft 9 in)

Career information
- Playing career: 1993–2011
- Position: Center

Career history
- 1993–1996: Radnički Kragujevac
- 1996–1998: Žito Vardar
- 1998–2000: MZT Skopje Aerodrom
- 2000–2001: Kumanovo
- 2001–2003: Vardar
- 2003–2004: S.C. Lusitânia
- 2005–2006: Swisslion Takovo
- 2006–2007: Tromsø Storm
- 2007–2008: BC Prievidza
- 2008–2010: MBK Rieker Komárno
- 2010–2011: Kumanovo

Ivica Blagojević (born January 19, 1974) is a Macedonian-Serbian former professional basketball player who last played for Kumanovo.
