= Muamer Taletović =

Bosnian basketball player

Personal information
- Born: 4 November 1975 (age 51) Sarajevo, SFR Yugoslavia
- Listed height: 6 ft 3 in (1.91 m)

Career information
- Playing career: 1994–2010
- Position: Shooting guard

Career history
- 1994–1997: Ceskopromex Sarajevo
- 1997–1999: Cenex Sarajevo
- 1999–2000: Novi Grad Atal
- 2000–2001: MZT Skopje
- 2001–2005: Crailsheim Merlins
- 2005–2006: Panthers Schwenningen
- 2006: Nürnberg
- 2006–2007: Hertener Löwen
- 2007–2008: BG Karlsruhe
- 2008–2010: Triland

Muamer Taletović (born 4 November 1975) is a Bosnian retired basketball player. He played in Germany, Macedonia and Bosnia. He last played for Triland of the Bosnian League.
