= Jovan Zdravevski =

Macedonian-Icelandic basketball player

Personal information
- Born: 22 April 1980 (age 46) Skopje, SR Macedonia
- Listed height: 1.98 m (6 ft 6 in)

Career information
- Playing career: 1996–2016
- Position: Small forward

Career history
- 1999–2000: Nikol Fert
- 2001–2002: BK Gostivar
- 2002–2004: MZT Skopje Aerodrom
- 2004–2007: Skallagrímur
- 2007–2008: KR
- 2008–2013: Stjarnan
- 2013–2016: Eos Lund IK

Career highlights
- 2x Icelandic Cup (2009, 2013); Icelandic Super Cup (2009)

Jovan Zdravevski (born 22 April 1980) is a Macedonian-Icelandic former professional basketball player who last played for Eos Lund IK. In 2008, he became a naturalized citizen of Iceland where he played from 2004 to 2013, when he moved to Sweden.
