= Antonio Minevski =

Macedonian basketball player

Personal information
- Born: March 6, 1972 (age 54) Skopje, Macedonia
- Listed height: 1.99 m (6 ft 6 in)

Career information
- Playing career: 1995–2004
- Position: Small forward

Career history
- 1995–1997: MZT Skopje
- 1997–1998: Strumica Tabak
- 1998–1999: Kumanovo
- 1999–2000: Alumina
- 2000–2004: Nemetali Ogražden

Antonio Minevski is a former Macedonian professional basketball small forward.
