= Srdjan Stanković =

Macedonian basketball player

Personal information
- Born: August 28, 1975 (age 51) Skopje, SR Macedonia, SFR Yugoslavia
- Listed height: 2.09 m (6 ft 10 in)

Career information
- Playing career: 1992–2009
- Position: Center

Career history
- 1992–1998: Godel Rabotnički
- 1998–2001: MZT Skopje
- 2001–2002: Kumanovo
- 2002–2003: Žito Vardar Živa
- 2003–2004: Ergonom
- 2004–2005: Rabotnički
- 2005: Crn Drim
- 2007–2008: Pelister
- 2008–2009: MZT Skopje

Srdjan Stanković (born August 28, 1975) is a Macedonian former professional basketball player who played for Rabotnički, MZT Skopje, Kumanovo, Pelister, Žito Vardar Živa, Crn Drim and Ergonom from Niš. He was also member of Macedonian national basketball team
