= Dimče Gaštarski =

Macedonian basketball player

Personal information
- Born: April 24, 1975 (age 51)
- Listed height: 1.96 m (6 ft 5 in)

Career information
- Playing career: 1997–2013
- Position: Small forward / shooting guard

Career history
- 1997–1998: Strumica Tabak
- 1998–2003: MZT Skopje
- 2003: Karpoš Sokoli
- 2004: Nemetali Ogražden
- 2004–2007: MZT Skopje
- 2011–2013: Vardar Apave

Dimče Gastarski (born April 24, 1975) is a Macedonian former professional basketball player who played for many clubs in Macedonia like MZT Skopje, Vardar and Karpoš Sokoli.

He is the older brother of Vlado Ilievski who is also basketball player.
