= Mirza Kurtović =

Macedonian basketball player

Personal information
- Born: 8 February 1977 (age 49) Skopje, SR Macedonia, SFR Yugoslavia
- Listed height: 1.94 m (6 ft 4 in)

Career information
- Playing career: 1993–2009
- Position: Point guard

Career history
- 1993–1999: MZT Skopje
- 1999: Fenerbahçe
- 1999–2001: Rabotnički
- 2001: Maccabi Giv'at Shmuel
- 2002: Kumanovo
- 2002–2004: Peristeri
- 2004–2005: Ionikos
- 2005–2006: Iraklis
- 2006–2009: Olympia Larissa

Mirza Kurtović (born 8 February 1977) is a former Macedonian professional basketball point guard who played for MZT Skopje Aerodrom, Rabotnički, Kumanovo in Macedonia. In the 2005–06 season he played for Iraklis in Greece. He was also member of Macedonia national basketball team.
