= Petar Boshaleski =

Macedonian basketball player

MZT Skopje
- Position: Shooting guard
- League: Macedonian League

Personal information
- Born: April 8, 2004 (age 22) Ohrid, Macedonia
- Listed height: 1.97 m (6 ft 6 in)
- Listed weight: 88 kg (194 lb)

Career information
- Playing career: 2020–present

Career history
- 2020–2024: Rabotnički
- 2024–2025: Pelister
- 2025: Ohrid
- 2025–2026: Tikveš
- 2026–present: MZT Skopje

Petar Boshaleski (born July 8, 2004) is a Macedonian professional basketball Shooting guard who is currently playing for MZT Skopje of the Macedonian First League.

== Professional career ==
On August 13, 2026, he signed a contract with KK MZT Skopje. Previously, he played for Pelister, where he made his debut in ABA 2 against HKK Široki.

== National team career ==
On July 2, 2026, he made his debut for the North Macedonian national basketball team against Ireland
