= Marin Petkov (basketball) =

Macedonian basketball player

Ohio Bobcats
- Position: Point guard

Personal information
- Born: February 20, 2003 (age 23) Skopje, Macedonia
- Listed height: 1.92 m (6 ft 4 in)

Career information
- College: Ohio (2026–present)
- Playing career: 2020–present

Career history
- 2020–2021: Vardar
- 2021–2023: Feniks 2010
- 2023–2026: MZT Skopje

Career highlights
- 3x Macedonian League (2024, 2025, 2026); 3x Macedonian Cup winner (2024, 2025, 2026); 3x Macedonian Super Cup (2023, 2024, 2025)

Marin Petkov (born February 20, 2003) is a Macedonian professional basketball player who last played for MZT Skopje of Macedonian First League.

== Professional career ==
On July 29, 2023, he signed for MZT Skopje. On November 14, 2023, he made his debut for MZT in ABA League Second Division, he achieved for 7 minutes, 3 points, in the game against KK Kansai Helios Domžale.
