= Kočani Delikates =

- Founded: 1968
- Location: Kočani, North Macedonia
- Team colors: red and White
- Championships: 0
Home	Away

Kočani Delikates is a defunct basketball club based in Kočani, North Macedonia. They played in the Macedonian First League until the season 1997/1998.

== Domestic Achievements ==
- Macedonian Basketball Cup Winners - 1995

== Notable former players ==
- (North Macedonia) Sašo Lazarov
- (North Macedonia) Gjorgji Knjazev
- (North Macedonia) Goran Dimitrijević
- (North Macedonia) Georgi Bujukliev
- (North Macedonia) Goce Andrevski
- (North Macedonia) Boris Nešović
- (North Macedonia) Vojislav Zivčević
- (United States) Michael Ingram
- (United States) Terrel Castle
- (United States) Bonner Upshaw
- (United States) Lafester Rhodes
- (United States) Joseph Marion
- (United States) Greg Anthony Grant
- (North Macedonia) (Montenegro) Darko Knežević
