= Marko Milovanović (basketball) =

Macedonian basketball player

Foppiani FSL Ship. & Log. Fidenza
- Position: Small forward
- League: Seria A3

Personal information
- Born: January 18, 2002 (age 24) Macedonia
- Listed height: 1.96 m (6 ft 5 in)

Career information
- Playing career: 2019–present

Career history
- 2019–2023: Juvi Cremona
- 2023–2025: MZT Skopje
- 2025: Madzari
- 2026–present: Foppiani FSL Ship. & Log. Fidenza

Career highlights
- 2× Macedonian League champion (2024, 2025); 2× Macedonian Cup winner (2024, 2025)

Marko Milovanović (born January 18, 2002) is a Macedonian professional basketball player who plays for Foppiani FSL Ship. & Log. Fidenza of Seria A3.

== Professional career ==
On July 29, 2023, he signed for MZT Skopje. On October 10, 2023, he made his debut for MZT in ABA League Second Division, he played 10 minutes in the game against KK Cedevita Junior.
