= Nikolče Petrušev =

Macedonian basketball player

Personal information
- Born: February 3, 1969 (age 57) Macedonia
- Listed height: 1.91 m (6 ft 3 in)

Career information
- NBA draft: undrafted: undrafted
- Playing career: 1988–2002

Career history
- 1994–1996: Rabotnički
- 1996–1997: Žito Vardar
- 1997–1998: MZT Skopje
- 1999–2000: Alumina
- 2000–2001: Vardar
- 2001–2002: MZT Skopje

Career highlights
- 3× Macedonian League champion (1994, 1995, 1996); 2× Macedonian Cup (1994, 1997)

Nikolče Petrušev (born February 3, 1969) is a Macedonian former professional basketball shooting guard.

== Personal life ==
Nikolče Petrušev is a father of the Philadelphia 76ers professional basketball player Filip Petrušev. After finishing his basketball carrier Nikolče moved to Belgrade where he got married and worked as a basketball coach.

== Honors ==
Rabotnichki

Macedonian League

- 1994, 1995, 1996

Macedonian Cup

- 1994

MZT Skopje

Macedonian Cup

- 1997
