= Igor Trajkovski =

Macedonian basketball player

Personal information
- Born: November 3, 1980 (age 46) Skopje, Macedonia
- Listed height: 1.80 m (5 ft 11 in)
- Position: Guard

Career history
- 1998–2002: Vardar
- 2003–2004: MZT Skopje
- 2004–2005: Karpoš Sokoli
- 2006: MZT Skopje
- 2006: Drita
- 2007: Karpoš Sokoli
- 2007–2008: U.M.F. Tindastoll Sauoarkrokur
- 2008: Karpoš Sokoli
- 2008: Pelister
- 2008–2009: AMAK SP
- 2009: Plejmejker Cubus
- 2009–2010: MZT Skopje
- 2010: Bashkimi Prizren
- 2010–2011: MZT Skopje

Igor Trajkovski (born November 3, 1980) is a former Macedonian professional basketball guard.
