= Bojan Radulović (basketball) =

Slovenian-Serbian basketball player

Free agent
- Position: Center

Personal information
- Born: March 31, 1992 (age 34) Subotica, Serbia, FR Yugoslavia
- Listed height: 2.11 m (6 ft 11 in)
- Listed weight: 114 kg (251 lb)

Career information
- NBA draft: 2014: undrafted
- Playing career: 2008–present

Career history
- 2008–2009: Elektra Šoštanj
- 2009–2012: Olimpija
- 2010–2011: → Geoplin Slovan
- 2012–2014: Helios Domžale
- 2014–2015: Metalac Farmakom
- 2015–2016: LTH Castings
- 2016–2017: Sixt Primorska
- 2017–2019: Olimpija
- 2019: Šentjur
- 2019–2020: MZT Skopje
- 2020: Koper Primorska

Career highlights
- Slovenian League champion (2018)

Bojan Radulović (Serbian Cyrillic: Бојан Радуловић, born 31 March 1992) is a Slovenian-Serbian professional basketball player who last played for Koper Primorska of the Slovenian League. He is a 2.11 m tall center.

== Playing career ==
Radulović is a center who started playing basketball with his hometown's club Spartak before moving to Slovenian Elektra Šoštanj and spending further five years playing for Union Olimpija, Geoplin Slovan, and Helios Domžale.

Radulović returned to Serbia by signing for Metalac Farmakom in September 2014, but his contract was terminated in March 2015, a few days before the final round of the 2014–15 ABA League season.

In September 2015, Radulović signed with the Slovenian First Division club KK Škofja Loka.
