= 2017–18 Macedonian First League =

Macedonian First League
- Season: 2017–18
- Teams: 12
- TV partner(s): Macedonian Radio Television

Finals
- Champions: Rabotnički (15th title)
- Runners-up: MZT Skopje Aerodrom
- Semifinalists: Kumanovo 2009; Blokotehna

The 2017–18 Macedonian First League was the 26th season of the Macedonian First League, with 12 teams participating in it. The season started in November 2017 and ended May 2018. Rabotnički achieved their fifteenth title after defeating MZT Skopje in the finals, that won the six previous championships.

== Competition format ==
The twelve teams that compose the league played a double-legged round robin tournament, where the six first qualified teams joined the Super League and the other six fought for avoiding the relegation.

The top four teams of the Super League qualified for the playoffs for the title.

== Teams ==
Location of teams in the 2017–18 Macedonian First League

Gostivar replaced Vardar, who was relegated from the previous season. As a result of an expansion of the league to 12 teams, Blokotehna and Skhupi were also promoted.

Team	Home City	Arena	Coach
AV Ohrid	Ohrid	Biljanini Izvori	(North Macedonia) Petar Čočoroski
Blokotehna	Gevgelija	Sportska Sala Blokotehna	(North Macedonia) Marjan Ilievski
Feni Industries	Kavadarci	Jasmin	(North Macedonia) Ljupčo Malinkov
Gostivar	Gostivar	Mladost Gostivar	(North Macedonia) Marjan Srbinovski
Karpoš Sokoli	Skopje	Boris Trajkovski Sports Center	(North Macedonia) Borče Daskalovski
Kožuv	Gevgelija	26-ti April	(North Macedonia) Pavle Nikolov
Kumanovo 2009	Kumanovo	Sports Hall Kumanovo	(North Macedonia) Aleksandar Petrović
MZT Skopje Aerodrom	Skopje	Jane Sandanski Arena	(North Macedonia) Aleksandar Todorov
Pelister	Bitola	Sports Hall Mladost	(North Macedonia) Zoran Petkovski
Rabotnički	Skopje	Gradski Park	(North Macedonia) Marin Dokuzovski
Shkupi	Skopje	Šaban Trstena	(North Macedonia) Enver Miftari
Strumica	Strumica	Park	(Greece) Vlasis Vlaikidis

Teams that play in the 2017–18 First Adriatic League
Teams that play in the 2017–18 Second Adriatic League
Teams that play in the 2017–18 BIBL

== Regular season ==
=== Standings ===
Pos	Team	Pld	W	L	GF	GA	GD	Pts	Qualification
1	Rabotnički	22	22	0	1996	1453	+543	44	Qualification to the Super League
2	Blokotehna	22	17	5	1909	1529	+380	39	Qualification to the Super League
3	MZT Skopje Aerodrom	22	16	6	1904	1547	+357	38	Qualification to the Super League
4	Kumanovo 2009	22	15	7	2013	1809	+204	37	Qualification to the Super League
5	Gostivar	22	14	8	1850	1654	+196	36	Qualification to the Super League
6	AV Ohrid	22	10	12	1816	1807	+9	32	Qualification to the Super League
7	Feni Industries	22	10	12	1759	1840	−81	32	Qualification to the relegation group
8	Kožuv	22	9	13	1650	1863	−213	31	Qualification to the relegation group
9	Pelister	22	7	15	1569	1865	−296	29	Qualification to the relegation group
10	Karpoš Sokoli	22	5	17	1797	2047	−250	27	Qualification to the relegation group
11	Shkupi	22	5	17	1735	2076	−341	27	Qualification to the relegation group
12	Strumica	22	2	20	1478	1986	−508	24	Qualification to the relegation group

Source: Macedonian Basketball Federation

== Second stage ==
=== Super League ===
Pos	Team	Pld	W	L	PF	PA	PD	Pts	Qualification
1	Rabotnički	32	30	2	2856	2162	+694	62	Qualification to playoffs
2	MZT Skopje Aerodrom	32	24	8	2762	2336	+426	56	Qualification to playoffs
3	Blokotehna	32	22	10	2740	2310	+430	54	Qualification to playoffs
4	Kumanovo 2009	32	20	12	2815	2677	+138	52	Qualification to playoffs
5	Gostivar	32	17	15	2568	2413	+155	49	
6	AV Ohrid	32	11	21	2554	2708	−154	43	

Source: Macedonian Basketball Federation

=== Relegation group ===
Pos	Team	Pld	W	L	PF	PA	PD	Pts	Relegation
1	Feni Industries	32	18	14	2665	2649	+16	50	
2	Kožuv	32	15	17	2468	2667	−199	47	
3	Pelister	32	14	18	2372	2588	−216	46	
4	Shkupi	32	9	23	2669	2951	−282	41	
5	Karpoš Sokoli (R)	32	8	24	2576	2987	−411	40	Relegation
6	Strumica (R)	32	4	28	2248	2845	−597	36	Relegation

Source: Macedonian Basketball Federation
(R) Relegated

== Playoffs ==
Playoffs will be played with a best-of-five games format, where the seeded team played games 1, 2 and 5 at home.

Semi-finals
Rabotnički	101	82	81
Kumanovo 2009	72	68	65
MZT Skopje Aerodrom	80	94	89	74
Blokotehna	74	106	72	72

Final
Rabotnički	86	76	87
MZT Skopje Aerodrom	77	75	84
