= 2018–19 Macedonian First League =

Macedonian First League
- Season: 2018–19
- Duration: 6 October 2018 – May 2019
- Teams: 11
- TV partner(s): Macedonian Radio Television

Regular season
- Season MVP: (North Macedonia) Damjan Stojanovski
- Promoted: MZT Skopje Aerodrom 2 Akademija FMP
- Relegated: Shkupi

Finals
- Champions: MZT Skopje Aerodrom
- Runners-up: Rabotnički
- Semifinalists: Blokotehna; Gostivar

The 2018–19 Macedonian First League was the 27th season of the Macedonian First League, with 11 teams participating.

Rabotnički were the defending champions.

== Competition format ==
The eleven teams that compose the league played a double-legged round robin tournament.

The two last qualified teams will join the relegation playoffs with the two best teams from the Second League.

== Teams ==
Location of teams in the 2018–19 Macedonian First League

Eleven teams joined the league as Vodnjanska was not admitted in the league.

Vardar replaced Karpoš Sokoli and Strumica, relegated from the previous season.

Team	Home City	Arena	Coach
AV Ohrid	Ohrid	Biljanini Izvori	(North Macedonia) Petar Čočoroski
Blokotehna	Gevgelija	Sportska Sala Blokotehna	(North Macedonia) Marjan Ilievski
Feni Industries	Kavadarci	Jasmin	(North Macedonia) Ljupčo Malinkov
Gostivar	Gostivar	Mladost Gostivar	(North Macedonia) Marjan Srbinovski
Kožuv	Gevgelija	26-ti April	(North Macedonia) Pavle Nikolov
Kumanovo 2009	Kumanovo	Sports Hall Kumanovo	(North Macedonia) Aleksandar Petrović
MZT Skopje Aerodrom	Skopje	Jane Sandanski Arena	(North Macedonia) Gjorgji Kočov
Pelister	Bitola	Sports Hall Mladost	(North Macedonia) Petar Sozovski
Rabotnički	Skopje	Gradski Park	(North Macedonia) Marin Dokuzovski
Shkupi	Skopje	Šaban Trstena	(North Macedonia) Enver Miftari
Vardar	Skopje	Kale	(North Macedonia) Darko Radulović

Teams that play in the 2018–19 Second Adriatic League
Teams that play in the 2018–19 BIBL

== Regular season ==
=== League table ===
Pos	Team	Pld	W	L	GF	GA	GD	Pts	Qualification
1	Rabotnički	20	18	2	1811	1405	+406	38	Qualification to the Super League
2	MZT Skopje Aerodrom	20	17	3	1817	1520	+297	37	Qualification to the Super League
3	Blokotehna	20	15	5	1681	1451	+230	35	Qualification to the Super League
4	Gostivar	20	14	6	1756	1498	+258	34	Qualification to the Super League
5	Kožuv	20	12	8	1605	1521	+84	32	Qualification to the Super League
6	Kumanovo 2009	20	11	9	1616	1504	+112	31	Qualification to the Super League
7	Feni Industries	20	10	10	1675	1615	+60	30	Qualification to the relegation group
8	AV Ohrid	20	5	15	1468	1698	−230	25	Qualification to the relegation group
9	Vardar	20	4	16	1516	1719	−203	24	Qualification to the relegation group
10	Pelister	20	4	16	1425	1680	−255	24	Qualification to the relegation group
11	Shkupi (Note: One point deducted for economical trouble.)	20	0	20	1337	2096	−759	19	Qualification to the relegation group

Source: Macedonian Basketball Federation

=== Results ===
Home \ Away	RAB	MZT	BLO	GOS	KOZ	KUM	FEN	OHR	VAR	PEL	SHK
Rabotnički	—	70–74	94–77	89–78	102–75	88–79	92–87	96–54	84–61	95–56	96–58
MZT Skopje Aerodrom	88–90	—	97–90	97–81	80–91	76–70	97–90	88–61	102–67	118–71	103–63
Blokotehna	75–61	81–78	—	68–84	76–67	81–69	77–70	77–68	98–76	97–69	128–47
Gostivar	61–85	61–74	98–86	—	70–69	81–78	94–70	89–94	99–66	118–60	115–62
Kožuv	73–84	79–89	64–76	73–78	—	56–50	74–63	92–81	91–82	73–68	118–71
Kumanovo 2009	70–82	72–76	86–65	75–63	73–79	—	74–86	77–69	73–65	87–75	120–90
Feni Industries	66–72	95–103	66–76	80–90	82–63	82–88	—	86–81	99–78	86–68	101–78
AV Ohrid	44–94	80–83	71–82	55–92	60–74	67–94	86–101	—	83–80	69–77	96–73
Vardar	89–107	72–102	67–88	80–82	70–91	77–85	70–80	76–68	—	65–63	118–59
Pelister	63–110	71–83	66–81	69–97	79–82	67–87	86–90	77–80	98–80	—	122–82
Shkupi	77–120	65–109	53–102	68–125	87–121	79–109	68–95	90–101	67–77	0–20	—

Source: Macedonian Basketball Federation
Legend: Blue = home team win; Red = away team win.

== Super League ==
=== League table ===
Pos	Team	Pld	W	L	PF	PA	PD	Pts	Qualification
1	MZT Skopje Aerodrom	30	25	5	2695	2312	+383	55	Qualification to playoffs
2	Rabotnički	30	24	6	2628	2159	+469	54	Qualification to playoffs
3	Blokotehna	30	22	8	2514	2225	+289	52	Qualification to playoffs
4	Gostivar	30	21	9	2606	2339	+267	51	Qualification to playoffs
5	Kožuv	30	13	17	2138	2311	−173	43	
6	Kumanovo 2009 (Note: One point docked to Kumanovo 2009.)	30	12	18	2253	2281	−28	41	

Source: Macedonian Basketball Federation

=== Results ===
Home \ Away	MZT	RAB	BLO	GOS	KOZ	KUM
MZT Skopje Aerodrom	—	85–63	86–76	95–91	89–88	92–57
Rabotnički	88–84	—	63–82	99–70	88–56	97–71
Blokotehna	75–90	90–89	—	94–98	87–78	78–55
Gostivar	98–82	80–70	66–78	—	84–72	86–84
Kožuv	76–88	79–85	84–93	86–89	—	20–0
Kumanovo 2009	80–87	57–75	65–80	81–88	87–74	—

Source: Macedonian Basketball Federation
Legend: Blue = home team win; Red = away team win.

== Relegation group ==
=== League table ===
Pos	Team	Pld	W	L	PF	PA	PD	Pts	Qualification
1	Feni Industries	28	18	10	2363	2106	+257	46	
2	Vardar	28	9	19	2116	2329	−213	37	
3	Pelister	28	9	19	2042	2320	−278	37	
4	AV Ohrid	28	7	21	2069	2345	−276	35	
5	Shkupi	28	0	28	1961	2838	−877	27	Qualification to relegation playoffs

Source: Macedonian Basketball Federation

=== Results ===
Home \ Away	FEN	VAR	PEL	OHR	SHK
Feni Industries	—	88–58	74–48	85–63	87–58
Vardar	58–73	—	86–83	78–70	86–69
Pelister	64–103	81–74	—	87–73	82–79
AV Ohrid	55–79	70–73	62–79	—	102–77
Shkupi	87–99	76–87	89–93	89–106	—

Source: Macedonian Basketball Federation
Legend: Blue = home team win; Red = away team win.

== Playoffs ==
Playoffs will be played with a best-of-five games format, where the seeded team played games 1, 2 and 5 at home.

Semifinals
1 MZT Skopje Aerodrom	87	92	87
4 Gostivar	68	86	77
2 Rabotnički	87	58	91	79	88
3 Blokotehna	79	85	73	93	78

Finals
1 MZT Skopje Aerodrom	80	69	85
2 Rabotnički	44	60	78

== Relegation playoffs ==
Team 1	Agg.	Team 2	1st leg	2nd leg
Akademija FMP	114–67	Shkupi	94–67	20–0
