= Aleksandar Kostoski =

Macedonian basketball player

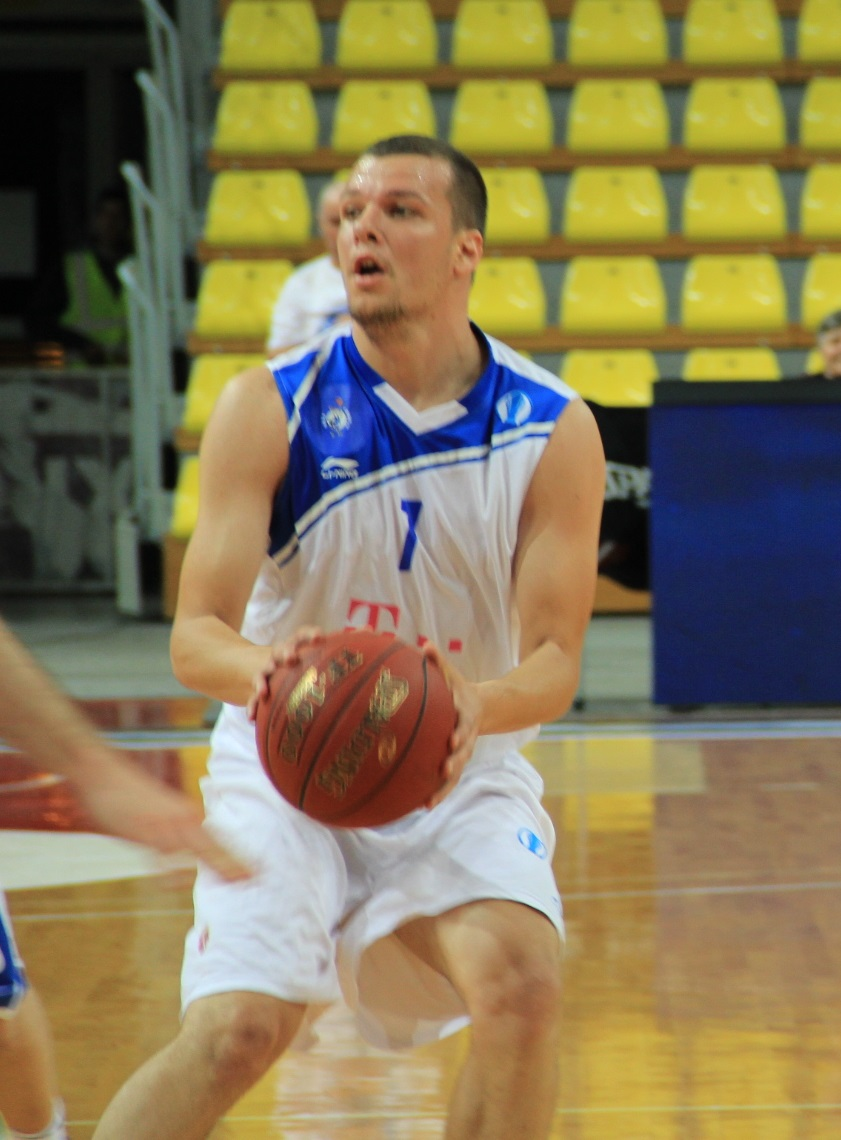
- Kostoski with MZT in 2013

Sokoli Shtip
- Position: Point guard
- League: Macedonian League

Personal information
- Born: 5 March 1988 (age 38) Skopje, SR Macedonia, SFR Yugoslavia
- Listed height: 1.88 m (6 ft 2 in)

Career information
- Playing career: 2006–present

Career history
- 2006–2007: Rabotnički
- 2007–2008: BCM Gravelines
- 2008–2009: Vardar
- 2009: Brașov
- 2009–2010: Vardar Osiguruvanje
- 2010–2011: Torus
- 2011–2013: Kumanovo
- 2013–2014: MZT Skopje
- 2014–2016: Kumanovo
- 2016–2018: Pitești
- 2018–2021: Gostivar
- 2021–2023: TFT
- 2023–2025: Pelister
- 2026: Rabotnički
- 2026–present: Sokoli Shtip

Career highlights
- Macedonian First League champion (2014); 2× Macedonian Cup winner (2014, 2022); Macedonian Cup MVP (2013)

Aleksandar Kostoski (Macedonian: Александар Костоски; born 5 March 1988) is a Macedonian professional basketball player. He plays played for Sokoli 1933. He is also a member of the Macedonian national team.

== Pro career ==
Kostoski started his pro career with French team Pau Orthez in 2004.

== National team ==
Kostoski has also been a member of the Macedonian national basketball team since 2004, when he represented Macedonia at the FIBA Europe Under-16 Championship. He has competed with the team at all FIBA levels of U16, U18, U20, even the Senior team. In the qualification games of the FIBA EuroBasket 2011 qualification, Kostoski was a member of the squad. Aleksandar Kostoski was a candidate for the Macedonian national basketball team for the 2012 FIBA World Olympic Qualifying Tournament in Caracas, Venezuela. According to the Coach Marjan Lazovski, Kostoski, along with Kiril Nikolovski and Bojan Trajkovski are likely to be the newest additions to the final team. On 29 August 2018 he signed with Macedonian basketball club Gostivar.
