= Andrej Magdevski =

Macedonian basketball player

Personal information
- Born: January 14, 1996 (age 30) Skopje, Republic of Macedonia
- Listed height: 1.92 m (6 ft 4 in)
- Listed weight: 85 kg (187 lb)

Career information
- Playing career: 2014–present
- Position: Point guard

Career history
- 2014–2015: Axarquía
- 2015–2016: Partizan
- 2016: → OKK Beograd
- 2016–2018: Feni Industries
- 2018: Gostivar
- 2018–2021: MZT Skopje
- 2021–2022: CSU Ploiești
- 2022: MZT Skopje
- 2022–2023: Donar Groningen
- 2023–2024: Pelister
- 2024–2026: MZT Skopje

Career highlights
- 3× Macedonian First League champion (2019, 2021, 2025); 2× Macedonian Cup winner (2025, 2026); Macedonian First League MVP (2021)

Andrej Magdevski (Macedonian: Андреј Магдевски; born January 14, 1996) is a Macedonian professional basketball player who last played for MZT Skopje of the Macedonian League
Adriatic League. He plays as point guard.

== Career ==
After playing in the youth teams of Partizan and Real Madrid, in Summer 2014 Magdevski signed for Unicaja Málaga, who loaned him to Clínicas Rincón Axarquía of the LEB Oro.

On September 29, 2015, he returned to Partizan.

On September 23, 2016, he signed with the Macedonian club Feni Industries. On August 20, 2017, he re-signed with Feni Industries. On January 10, 2018, he signed with Gostivar.

On August 4, 2018, he signed with MZT Skopje.

Magdevski joined Donar of the Dutch BNXT League in November 2022, where he replaced Charles Callison as the team's foreign point guard. He made his debut on 11 December in a 72–69 home win over Landstede Hammers, and scored ten points for Donar.

== Macedonia national team ==
Magdevski made his debut for the Macedonia national team at the FIBA EuroBasket 2015 qualification, where he played six games averaging 3.8 points and 16.5 minutes.
