= Viktor Efremovski =

Macedonian basketball player

No. 25 – Rabotnički
- Position: Shooting guard
- League: Macedonian First League

Personal information
- Born: 21 October 1998 (age 28) Gostivar, Macedonia
- Listed height: 1.94 m (6 ft 4 in)

Career information
- Playing career: 2014–present

Career history
- 2014–2015: Vardar
- 2015–2021: Rabotnički
- 2021–2023: Gostivar
- 2023–present: Rabotnički

Career highlights
- Macedonian League U20 MVP (2017-18); Macedonian League champion (2018)

Viktor Efremovski (born 21 October 1998) is a Macedonian professional basketball player for Rabotnički of the Macedonian First League. Efremovski is also a member of the Macedonian national basketball team.
