= Aleksandar Jončevski =

Macedonian basketball player and coach

Vëllaznimi
- Position: Head coach
- League: Kosovo Basketball Superleague

Personal information
- Born: 9 January 1981 (age 45) Skopje, SR Macedonia, SFR Yugoslavia

Career information
- Playing career: 1999–2009
- Coaching career: 2010–present

Career history

Playing
- 1999–2002: Rabotnički
- 2002–2003: Vardar 2000
- 2003–2004: Ohrid
- 2004–2005: Gostivar
- 2005–2006: KK Karpoš Sokoli
- 2007–2008: Pop Sport
- 2008–2009: Vardar 2000

Coaching
- 2010–2011: KFUM Uppsala U18
- 2011–2012: Rabotnički (assistant)
- 2012–2015: MZT Skopje (assistant)
- 2015–2016: MZT Skopje
- 2016: MZT Skopje (assistant)
- 2016–2017: MZT Skopje
- 2012–2015, 2017–2019: Macedonia (assistant)
- 2017: Spartak Subotica
- 2018: Rabotnički (assistant)
- 2018–2021: Kožuv
- 2021–2022: Gostivar
- 2022–2023: Trepça
- 2023: Kozuv
- 2021–2025: North Macedonia
- 2023–2024: Bashkimi Prizren
- 2024–2025: Śląsk Wrocław
- 2025–2026: Atomerőmű SE
- 2026–present: Vëllaznimi

Aleksandar Jončevski (born 9 January 1981) is a Macedonian professional basketball coach. He is a head coach for Vëllaznimi of the Kosovo Basketball Superleague.

== Coaching career ==
He started his coaching career in 2010 in KFUM Uppsala U18 in Sweden. After being one year ass.coach in Rabotnicki, he became assistant head coach in MZT Skopje from 2012 to 2015, competing in Adriatic League, ULEB Eurocup and the national Championship. In December 2015 he became head coach of MZT Skopje and lead the team to the National Cup and Championship trophy for the season 2015/16. Also, he was an assistant coach in the Macedonian national team (2012–2015) for pre-Olympic tournament in Caracas, Venezuela 2012, Eurobasket 2013 in Slovenia and Eurobasket 2015 in Croatia.

He was assistant coach of many coaches in MZT like Aleksandar Todorov, Aleš Pipan, Vlada Vukoičić, Zmago Sagadin, Boban Mitev, Zoran Martič, Vrbica Stefanov and Emil Rajković.

On 13 March 2017, he became assistant coach of Macedonia national basketball team.

On 19 April 2017, he became a head coach of Serbian basketball team Spartak Subotica

On 5 April 2018, he became assistant coach of Marin Dokuzovski in Rabotnički.

On 28 December 2018, he became a head coach in Kožuv.
