= 2016–17 Macedonian First League (basketball) season =

Macedonian First League
- Season: 2016–17
- Duration: 19 November 2016 – 4 March 2017 (Regular season)
- Teams: 10
- TV partner: Macedonian Radio Television

Regular season
- Top seed: MZT Skopje
- Season MVP: (Netherlands) Charlon Kloof

Finals
- Champions: MZT Skopje (6th title)
- Runners-up: Karpoš Sokoli

The 2016–17 Macedonian First League was the 25th season of the Macedonian First League, with 10 teams participating in it. The season's regular season started on 19 November 2016 and finished on 4 March 2017. MZT Skopje and Karpoš Sokoli joined the league in a further stage. The season finished with the last game of the Finals on 27 May 2017. MZT Skopje won its sixth national title.

== Teams ==
MZT Skopje participated in both ABA League and EuroCup Basketball. Karpoš Sokoli participated in both ABA League and Balkan International Basketball League. Both teams would join the First League after January 2017 with the start of the second stage.

Team	City	Arena	Colour	Coach
Feni Industries	Kavadarci	Jasmin		(North Macedonia) Ljupčo Malinkov
Rabotnički	Skopje	Gradski Park		(North Macedonia) Marin Dokuzovski
Kumanovo 2009	Kumanovo	Sports Hall Kumanovo		(North Macedonia) Marjan Srbinovski
MZT Skopje	Skopje	Jane Sandanski Arena		(Croatia) Ante Nazor
Strumica	Strumica	Park		(North Macedonia) Petar Nastev
Kožuv	Gevgelija	26-ti April		(North Macedonia) Igor Mihajlovski
Karpoš Sokoli	Skopje	Boris Trajkovski Sports Center		(Serbia) Dragan Nikolić
AV Ohrid	Ohrid	Biljanini Izvori		(North Macedonia) Petar Čočoroski
Vardar	Skopje	SRC Kale		(North Macedonia) Gjorgji Kočov
Pelister	Bitola	Sports Hall Mladost		(North Macedonia) Zoran Petkovski

Teams that participate in the ABA League

Teams that participate in the Balkan International Basketball League

== Regular season ==
Pos	Team	Pld	W	L	PF	PA	PD	Pts	Qualification
1	Feni Industries	14	12	2	1106	925	+181	26	Qualification to group 1 to 6
2	Rabotnički	14	11	3	1192	954	+238	25	Qualification to group 1 to 6
3	Kumanovo (Note: Kumanovo docked one point.)	14	10	4	1033	957	+76	23	Qualification to group 1 to 6
4	Kožuv (Note: Kožuv docked one point.)	14	9	5	1049	936	+113	22	Qualification to group 1 to 6
5	Strumica (Note: Strumica docked one point.)	14	5	9	910	1015	−105	18	Qualification to group 7 to 10
6	AV Ohrid	14	4	10	903	1014	−111	18	Qualification to group 7 to 10
7	Pelister	14	4	10	909	1089	−180	18	Qualification to group 7 to 10
8	Vardar	14	0	14	904	1116	−212	14	Qualification to group 7 to 10

Source: Macedonian Basketball Federation

== Second stage ==
=== Group 1 to 6 ===
Pos	Team	Pld	W	L	PF	PA	PD	Pts	Qualification
1	MZT Skopje	10	9	1	807	695	+112	19	Qualification to playoffs
2	Rabotnički	10	7	3	802	755	+47	17	Qualification to playoffs
3	Karpoš Sokoli	10	7	3	842	795	+47	17	Qualification to playoffs
4	Kumanovo	10	3	7	803	869	−66	13	Qualification to playoffs
5	Feni Industries	10	2	8	718	830	−112	12	
6	Kožuv	10	2	8	783	811	−28	12	

Source: Macedonian Basketball Federation

=== Group 7 to 10 ===
Matches of the regular season are included in the final table of the group.

Pos	Team	Pld	W	L	PF	PA	PD	Pts	Qualification or relegation
1	Strumica (Note: Strumica docked one point.)	20	9	11	1304	1400	−96	28	
2	AV Ohrid	20	7	13	1334	1450	−116	27	
3	Pelister	20	7	13	1310	1496	−186	27	
4	Vardar	20	2	18	1329	1539	−210	22	Relegated

Source: Macedonian Basketball Federation

== Playoffs ==
Semi-finals
1 MZT Skopje	71	93	84
4 Kumanovo 2009	51	88	64
2 Rabotnički	76	79	65
3 Karpoš Sokoli	77	90	76

Final
1 MZT Skopje	77	93	86	78	86
3 Karpoš Sokoli	76	104	80	86	82

== Awards ==
=== MVP ===
Pos	Player	Team	Ref
G	(Netherlands) Charlon Kloof	MZT Skopje	
