= Adem Mekić =

Macedonian basketball player

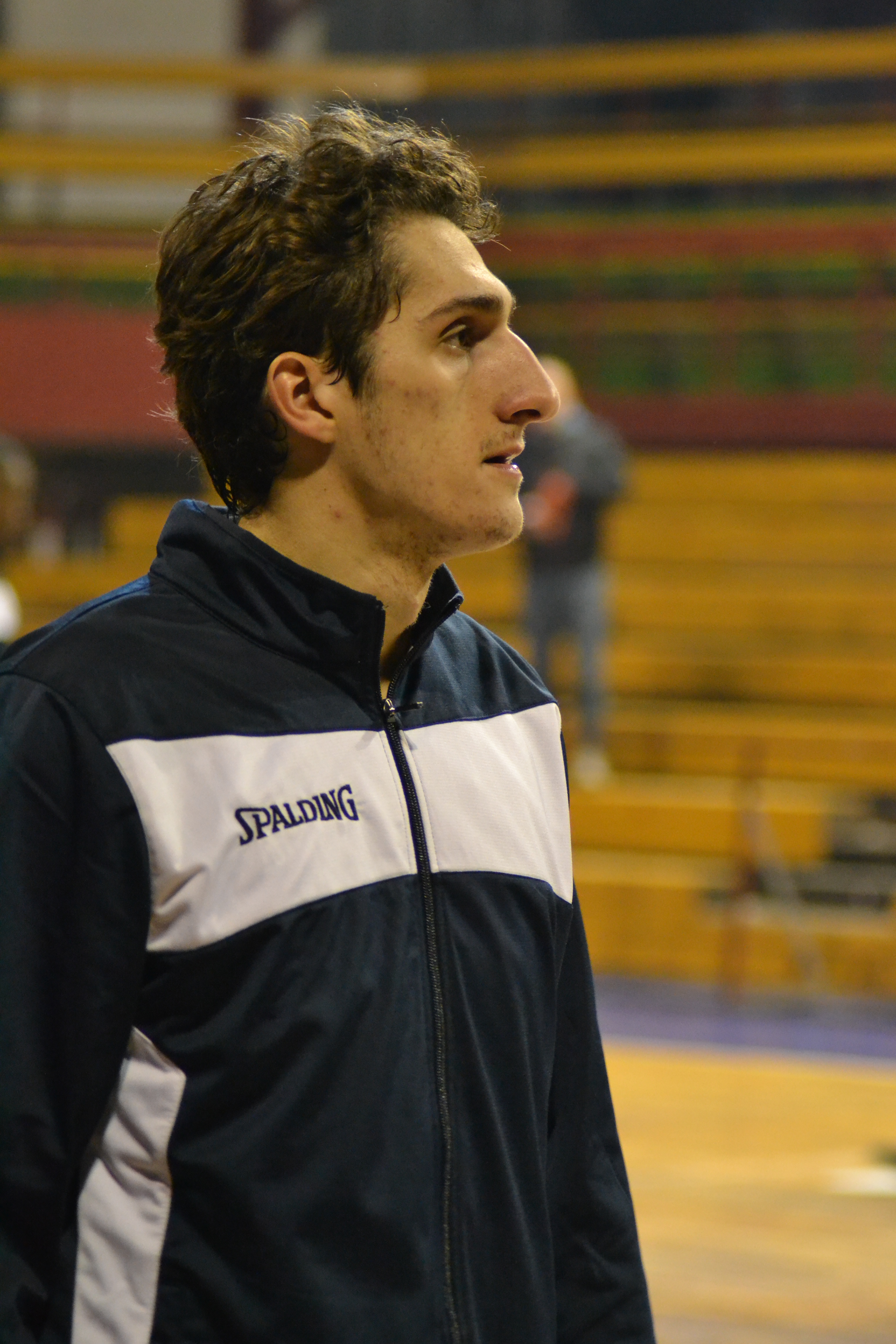

No. 22 – MZT Skopje
- Position: Shooting guard / small forward
- League: Macedonian First League

Personal information
- Born: December 28, 1995 (age 30) Skopje, Macedonia
- Listed height: 1.97 m (6 ft 6 in)
- Listed weight: 91 kg (201 lb)

Career information
- Playing career: 2013–present

Career history
- 2013–2014: Vardar
- 2014–2017: MZT Skopje
- 2017–2019: Kumanovo
- 2019: AV Ohrid
- 2019–2020: Pelister
- 2020–2023: MZT Skopje
- 2023: Timișoara
- 2023–2024: Zadar
- 2024: TFT
- 2024–2026: Bora
- 2026: Zadar
- 2026: Kumanovo
- 2026–present: MZT Skopje

Career highlights
- 5× Macedonian League champion (2015–2017, 2021, 2022); 2× Croatian League champion (2023, 2024); 3× Macedonian Cup (2015, 2016, 2021); Croatian Cup winner (2024)

Adem Mekić (born December 28, 1995) is a Macedonian professional basketball player for MZT Skopje of the Macedonian First League. He also represents North Macedonia internationally.
