= Bojan Trajkovski =

Macedonian basketball player

Personal information
- Born: 11 September 1986 (age 40) Makedonska Kamenica, SR Macedonia, Yugoslavia
- Listed height: 2.08 m (6 ft 10 in)
- Listed weight: 110 kg (243 lb)

Career information
- Playing career: 2002–2024
- Position: Power forward

Career history
- 2002–2003: Balkan Steel
- 2003–2009: Rabotnički
- 2009–2010: Feni Industries
- 2010–2012: Torus
- 2012–2013: Feni Industries
- 2013–2014: Lirija
- 2014–2015: Czarni Słupsk
- 2015: Sigal Prishtina
- 2015: Rabotnički
- 2015–2016: Kumanovo
- 2016: Sigal Prishtina
- 2016–2017: Karpoš Sokoli
- 2017–2018: MZT Skopje
- 2018–2019: Atomerőmű SE
- 2019: Gostivar
- 2019–2020: Kožuv
- 2020–2022: Pelister
- 2022–2024: Feniks 2010

Career highlights
- 5× Macedonian League (2004–2006, 2009–2010); Kosovo Superleague champion (2015); Balkan League champion (2015); 6× Macedonian Cup (2004–2006, 2010, 2017, 2018)

Bojan Trajkovski (Macedonian: Бојан Трајковски; born 11 September 1986) is a former Macedonian professional basketball player who plays for Feniks 2010 of the Macedonian First League. He is a member of the Macedonian national basketball team.

== Pro career ==
Trajkovski started his pro career with Macedonian Team Balkan Steel in 2002.

Bojan is a 2.08 m big man capable of playing the power forward and center positions. His natural position is the power forward spot. His size does not limit him to playing on the block.

On 2 December 2016, he signed for Karpos Sokoli

On 11 August 2017, he signed with MZT Skopje.

On 1 June 2018, he signed with Hungarian team Atomerőmű SE.

== National team ==
Trajkovski has also been a member of the Macedonian national basketball team since 2003, when he represented Macedonia at the FIBA Europe Under-16 Championship. He has competed with the team at all FIBA levels of U16, U18, U20, even the Senior team. Bojan Trajkovski is candidate for the Macedonian national basketball team for the 2012 FIBA World Olympic Qualifying Tournament in Caracas, Venezuela. According to the Coach Marjan Lazovski, Trajkovski, along with Aleksandar Kostoski and Kiril Nikolovski are likely to be the newest additions to the Senior team.
