= Marko Simonovski (basketball) =

Macedonian basketball player

Personal information
- Born: June 28, 1989 (age 37) Skopje, SR Macedonia, SFR Yugoslavia
- Listed height: 6 ft 4 in (1.93 m)
- Listed weight: 202 lb (92 kg)

Career information
- NBA draft: 2011: undrafted
- Playing career: 2007–present
- Position: Shooting guard

Career history
- 2007–2009: Vardar
- 2010: Rabotnički
- 2010: Arkadia Traiskirchen Lions
- 2011: Rabotnički
- 2011–2013: Feni Industries
- 2013–2014: Rabotnički
- 2014–2015: MZT Skopje
- 2015–2016: Kumanovo
- 2016–2019: MZT Skopje
- 2020–2022: Kožuv
- 2022: Khane Khouzestan
- 2022: Aix Maurienne Savoie Basket
- 2022: Nobogh Arak
- 2023: TFT

Career highlights
- 3× Macedonian League (2015, 2017, 2019); 2× Macedonian Cup (2011, 2018); Macedonian League Final MVP (2015)

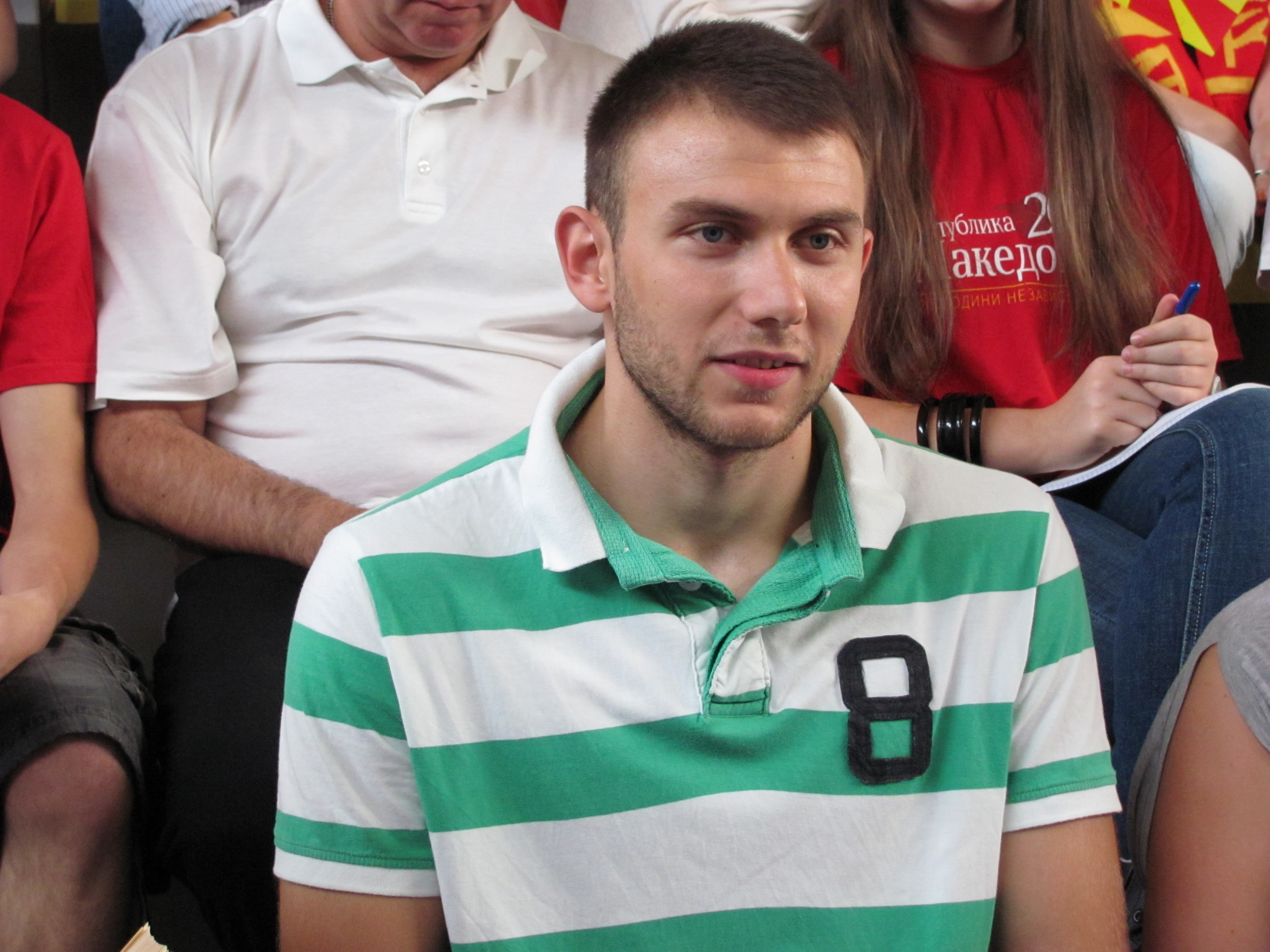
Marko Simonovski

Marko Simonovski (born June 28, 1989) is a former Macedonian professional basketball player. He was also member of Macedonian national basketball team.

== National team ==
Simonovski is also a member of the Macedonian national basketball team. He competed with the team at Eurobasket 2011 and helped the team to a fourth-place finish, its best ever performance at the continental championship.
