= Damjan Krstevski =

Macedonian basketball player

Kozuv
- Position: Shooting guard
- League: Macedonian First League

Personal information
- Born: June 30, 1999 (age 27) Skopje, Macedonia
- Listed height: 1.93 m (6 ft 4 in)

Career information
- Playing career: 2017–present

Career history
- 2017–2019: Rabotnički
- 2019–2022: Vardar
- 2022–2024: TFT
- 2024–2026: Pelister
- 2026–present: Kožuv

Career highlights
- Macedonian League champion (2018)

Damjan Krstevski, Дамјан Крстевски (born June 30, 1999) is a Macedonian professional basketball Shooting guard, who currently plays for Kožuv in the Macedonian First League.

== Professional career ==
He started his career in Rabotnički. On his debut for the club, he achieved 9 points, 2 assists and 2 rebounds in an 85–103 win over the Shkupi.

== Junior ABA League ==
On November 24, 2017, he was loaned to MZT Skopje U19 for the semi-final tournament in Belgrade. He made his debut for the MZT Skopje in their season opener scoring 27 points, seven rebounds, one assist and five steals in an 86–82 win over the Mornar Bar U19.
