= Stojan Gjuroski =

Macedonian basketball player

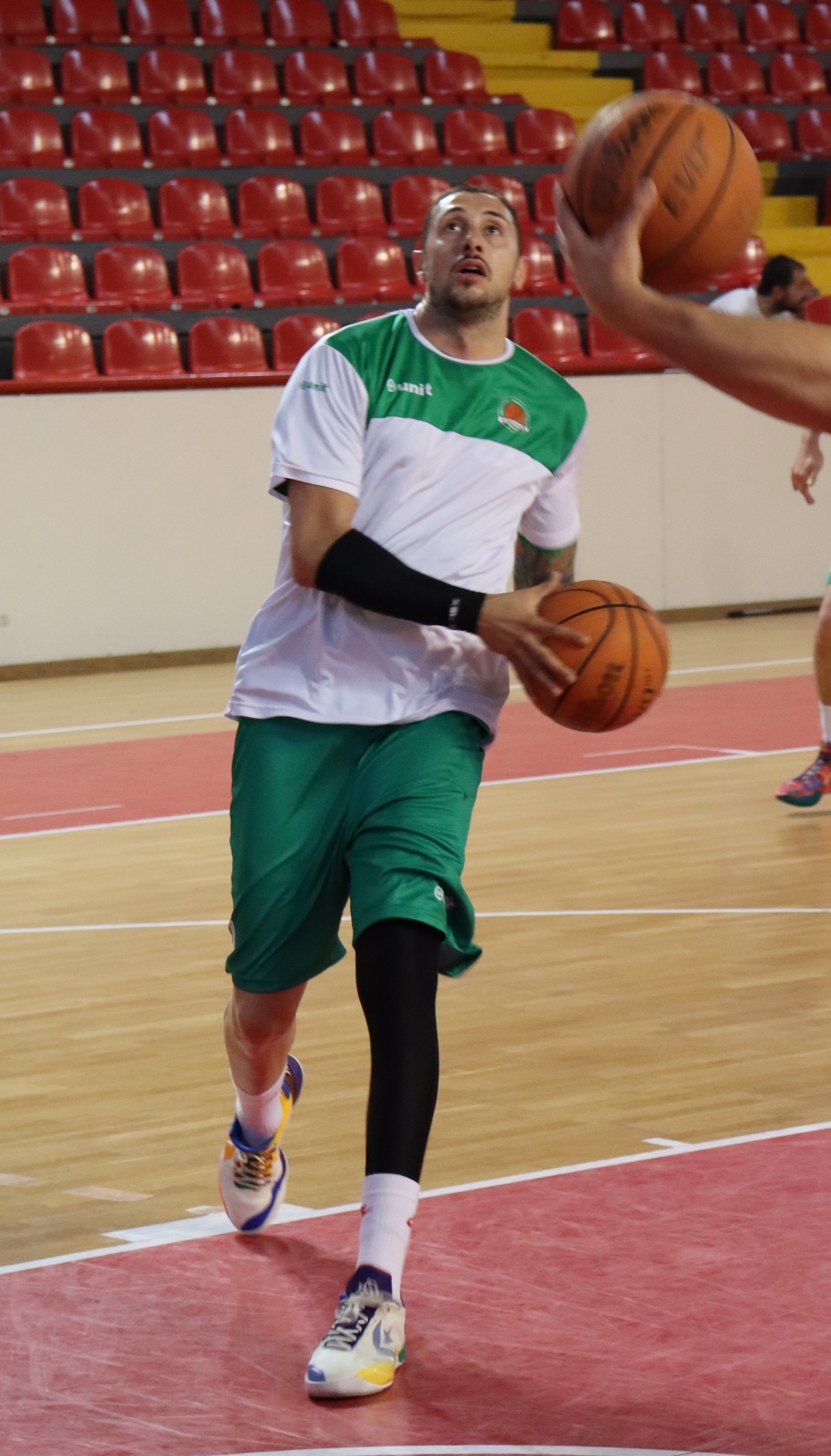

No. 11 – Kumanovo
- Position: Small forward / power forward
- League: Macedonian League

Personal information
- Born: November 6, 1991 (age 35) Gostivar, Macedonia
- Listed height: 2.03 m (6 ft 8 in)
- Listed weight: 100 kg (220 lb)

Career information
- High school: Life Center Academy (Burlington, New Jersey)
- College: Louisiana Tech (2010–2014)
- Playing career: 2014–present

Career history
- 2014–2015: Levski Sofia
- 2015: Rabotnički
- 2015–2016: Kožuv
- 2016–2017: MZT Skopje Aerodrom
- 2017: Karpoš Sokoli
- 2017–2018: Blokotehna
- 2018–2019: Huesca
- 2019: Melilla
- 2019–2020: Évreux
- 2020–2021: HLA Alicante
- 2021–2022: Pelister
- 2022–2023: Club Ourense Baloncesto
- 2023–2026: Rabotnički
- 2026–present: Kumanovo

Career highlights
- Macedonian League champion (2017)

Stojan Gjuroski (Macedonian: Стојан Ѓуроски) (born November 6, 1991) is a Macedonian professional basketball player for Kumanovo of Macedonian League. He graduated from Louisiana Tech University in 2014, where he played for four years. He is also a member of the Macedonian national basketball team since 2013.

== College ==
| Year | Team | GP | GS | MPG | FG% | 3P% | FT% | RPG | APG | SPG | BPG | PPG |
|---|---|---|---|---|---|---|---|---|---|---|---|---|
| 2010–11 | Louisiana Tech | 1 | 0 | 12.0 | .333 | .000 | .000 | 2.00 | 0.00 | 0.00 | 1.00 | 2.00 |
| 2011–12 | Louisiana Tech | 8 | 0 | 4.1 | .200 | .000 | .000 | 0.88 | 0.25 | 0.12 | 0.00 | 0.50 |
| 2012–13 | Louisiana Tech | 15 | 0 | 3.5 | .350 | 375 | .500 | 0.13 | 0.00 | 0.00 | 0.07 | 1.40 |
| 2013–14 | Louisiana Tech | 25 | 0 | 4.3 | .226 | .182 | .333 | 1.08 | 0.24 | 0.08 | 0.00 | 0.80 |
