= Marjan Lazovski =

Macedonian basketball player (1962–2020)

Personal information
- Born: 7 September 1962 Skopje, FPR Yugoslavia (now North Macedonia)
- Died: 19 December 2020 (aged 58) Skopje, North Macedonia
- Position: Coach

Career history

Coaching
- 2003–2007: Vardar
- 2007–2012: Macedonia (assistant)
- 2007–2008: MZT Skopje
- 2008–2009: AMAK SP
- 2009: Swisslion Pelister
- 2010–2011: Torus
- 2011–2012: Rabotnički
- 2012: Macedonia
- 2017–2019: Macedonia Women

Marjan Lazovski (Macedonian: Марјан Лазовски; 7 September 1962 – 19 December 2020) was a Macedonian professional basketball player and coach of KK Rabotnički, MZT Aerodrom, Vardar, and AMAK SP.

== Career ==
Lazovski served as an assistant coach for the Macedonia national basketball team for five years. In February 2012, he was named head coach after former boss Marin Dokuzovski decided not to continue in the job. As of 5 October 2012, Lazovski had resigned from his post as head coach of the Macedonia national basketball team, citing health reasons and club team needs, as first priority.

Lazovski died at age 58 on 19 December 2020, from COVID-19 during the COVID-19 pandemic in North Macedonia.
