= Ivan Sapundjiev =

Macedonian basketball player

Pelister
- Position: Shooting guard
- League: Macedonian League

Personal information
- Born: May 13, 1995 (age 31) Skopje, Macedonia
- Listed height: 1.97 m (6 ft 6 in)

Career history
- 2013–2018: Karpoš Sokoli
- 2018–2019: Feni Industries
- 2019–2020: Vardar
- 2020–2022: TFT
- 2022–2024: Pelister
- 2024–2025: TFT
- 2025–2026: Gostivar
- 2026–present: Pelister

Career highlights
- Macedonian Cup winner (2022)

Ivan Sapundjiev (born May 13, 1995) is a Macedonian professional basketball shooting guard who currently plays for Pelister in the Macedonian First League.
