= Ivica Dimčevski =

Macedonian basketball player

Ivica Dimcevski
Madzari GB
- Position: Shooting guard
- League: Macedonian Second League

Personal information
- Born: June 27, 1989 (age 37) Skopje, SR Macedonia, Yugoslavia
- Listed height: 1.94 m (6 ft 4 in)

Career information
- Playing career: 2007–present

Career history
- 2007–2010: Vardar
- 2010–2012: Torus
- 2012–2014: Kumanovo
- 2014–2016: Rabotnički
- 2016: Strumica
- 2017: Kožuv
- 2017–2021: Gostivar
- 2021–2022: EuroNickel 2005
- 2022–2025: Feniks 2010
- 2025–present: Madzari GB

Ivica Dimcevski (born June 27, 1989) is a Macedonian professional basketball player for Madzari GB of the Macedonian League. He is also member of Macedonia national basketball team.
