= Simonovski =

Simonovski (Macedonian: Симоновски) is a Macedonian masculine surname, its feminine counterpart is Simonovska. It may refer to

- Kiril Simonovski (1915–1984), Macedonian football player
- Marko Simonovski (born 1992), Macedonian football player
- Marko Simonovski (basketball) (born 1989), Macedonian basketball player
