= North Macedonia men's national basketball team =

North Macedonia
- FIBA ranking: 65 ▼1 (1 September 2026)
- Joined FIBA: 1993 (1936 within Yugoslavia)
- FIBA zone: FIBA Europe
- National federation: BFNM
- Coach: Josep Maria Berrocal
- Nickname(s): Лавови (Lions); Црвено-Жолти (The Red and Yellow); Фаланга (Phalanx)

FIBA World Cup
- Appearances: None

EuroBasket
- Appearances: 5
- Medals: None
Home	Away

First international
- Estonia 74–60 Macedonia (Wrocław, Poland; 30 May 1993)

Biggest win
- Macedonia 105–66 Luxembourg (Skopje, Macedonia; 3 September 2005)

Biggest defeat
- Croatia 128–72 Macedonia (Wrocław, Poland; 1 June 1993)

The North Macedonia men's national basketball team (Macedonian: Кошаркарска репрезентација на Северна Македонија, romanized: Košarkarska reprezentacija na Severna Makedonija) represents North Macedonia in international basketball and is controlled by the Basketball Federation of North Macedonia. They joined FIBA in 1993, after they gained independence from Yugoslavia. That same year the national team played their first official match against Estonia. Prior to 1993, Macedonian players took part on the Yugoslavia national team.

Macedonia debuted in their first international tournament at the EuroBasket in 1999. They have appeared five times at the event overall, with their top performance coming in 2011, finishing in fourth place.

== History ==
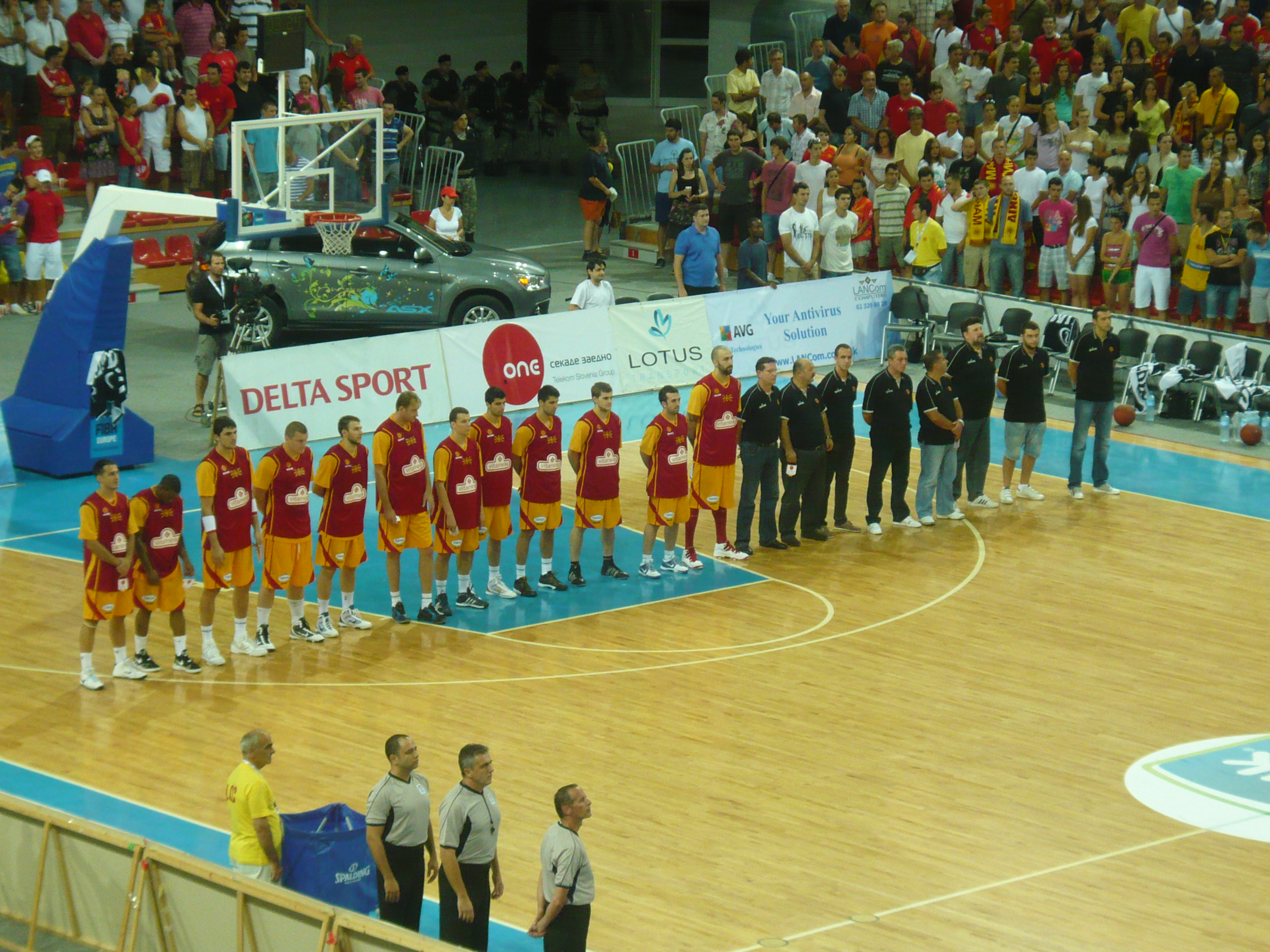
Macedonia basketball team prior to a match at Boris Trajkovski Sports Center

Before 1991, Macedonia was a Federal Republic of Yugoslavia, with players from Macedonia being part of the Yugoslavia national team. First match was in 1945 when Macedonia finished 4th. The first match was in 1945 against Croatia finishing 27-29. The team had mostly played matches against teams from other republics of federation and was represented by Macedonian players under the traditional red, color.

=== EuroBasket 1999 ===
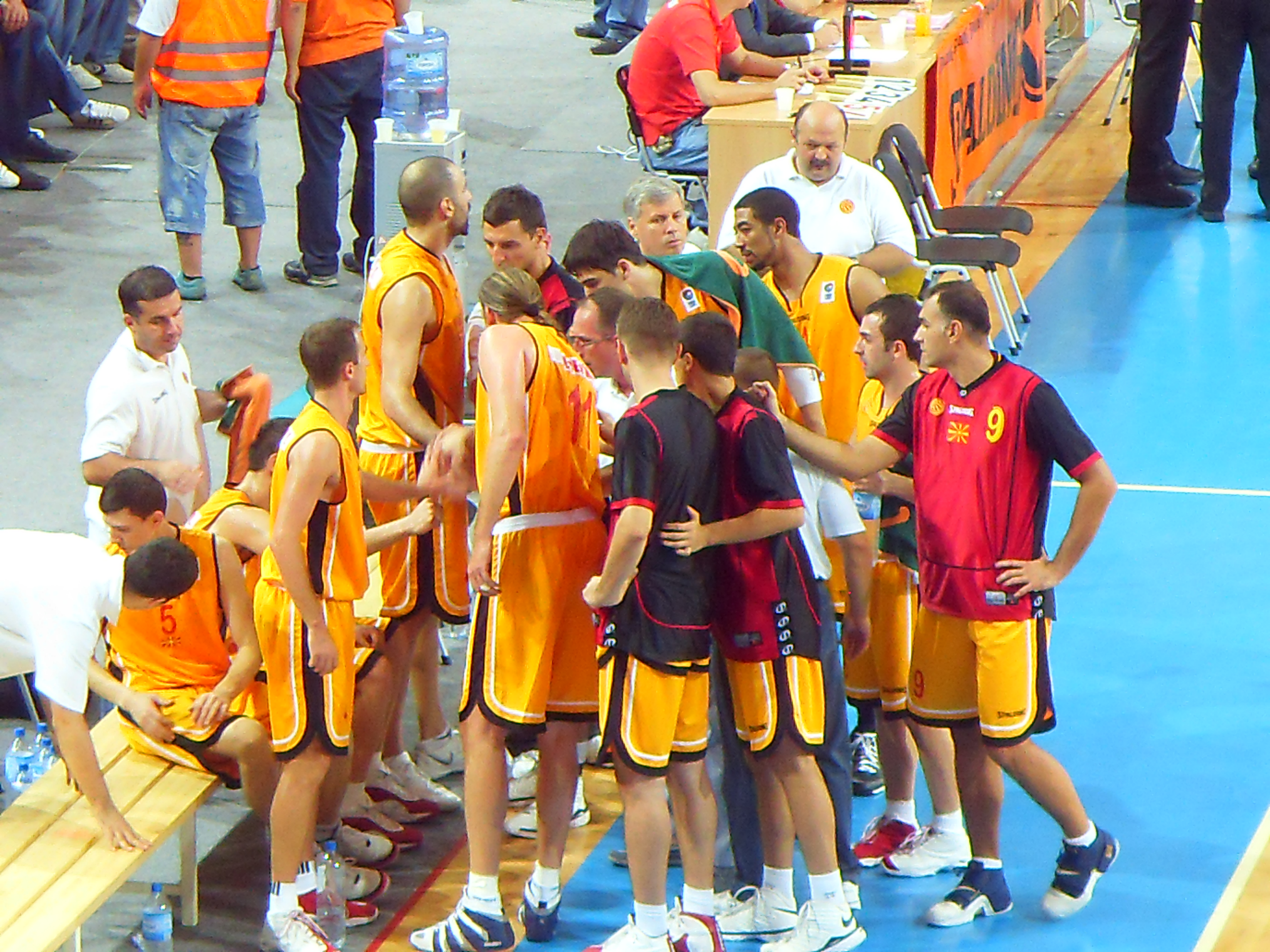
Macedonia basketball team at a time out during a match with Latvia.

After qualifying for EuroBasket 1999, the national team was placed in Group A, along with FR Yugoslavia, France and Israel. The first game Macedonia came out firing showing solid competitive play against the French Team, however, eventually lost by a narrow margin of 67–71. Next up, was Group A favorites FR Yugoslavia, showing superior play with their post up offense, Macedonia lost 68–83. With the final game of the group Macedonia played a fairly even match, however, luck was not on their side, losing 82–84. Even though Macedonia lost all 3 of their matches to be eliminated, the team showed heart and talent with their impressive play against France and Israel. Due to their small margin of the losses Macedonia ended the tournament ranked as 13th overall.

=== EuroBasket 2009 ===
EuroBasket 2009 was the first EuroBasket tournament that Macedonia qualified for in a decade. Macedonia was placed in Group A, along with Greece, Croatia and Israel. Macedonia began the tournament with a brutal 54–86 loss to rivals Greece, but rebounded with an 82–79 victory over Israel. Despite dropping their last match against Croatia, the Israel result was enough to secure second round qualification. In the second round, Macedonia was placed in Group E alongside France, Germany and Russia. Macedonia lost to France in the second round opener, but famously defeated Germany in the next game. Against Russia, Macedonia was narrowly defeated by a score of 69–71. This performance was not enough to secure a berth in to the knockout round. Nevertheless, Macedonia considers this as a historic success for the national team, since it was only the country's second appearance at the EuroBasket and the team advanced past the first round. In the final tournament rankings, Macedonia ranked 9th place with a record of 2–4.

=== EuroBasket 2011 ===
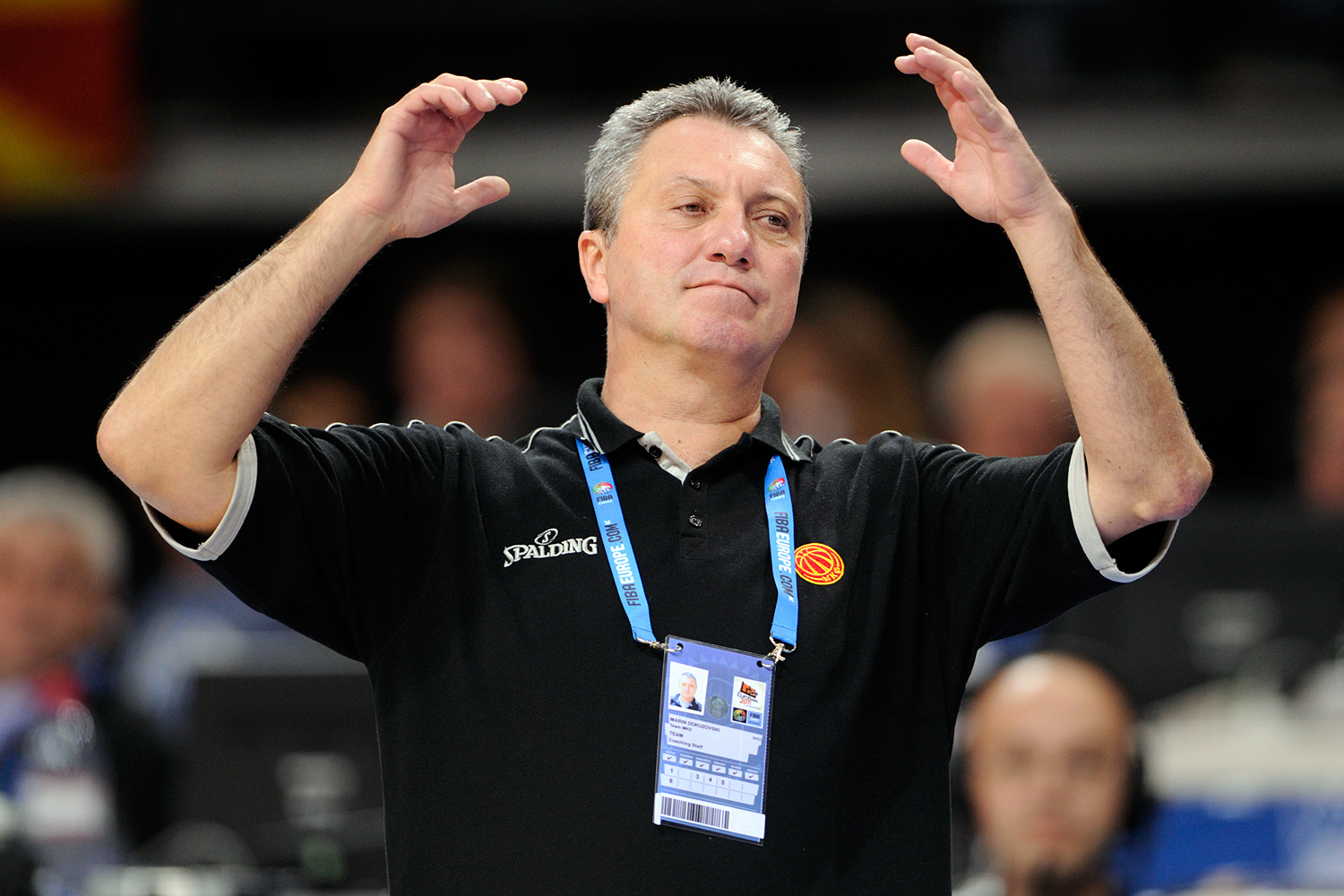
Marin Dokuzovski, head coach of the team in 2011.

Through the qualifying round, Macedonia qualified for EuroBasket 2011 and was in Group C along with Bosnia and Herzegovina, Croatia, Greece, Montenegro, and Finland in the preliminary phase. The national team lost their first match to Montenegro 65–70 in overtime but won the remaining four against Croatia 78–76, Greece 72–58, Finland 72–70, and Bosnia and Herzegovina 75–63. Macedonia finished first in the group and advanced to the second round.

In the second round, Macedonia was in Group F with Russia, Slovenia, Greece, Georgia, and Finland. Having beaten Greece and Finland in the preliminary round, Macedonia went in to the second round with a 2–0 record. After beating Georgia 65–63, Macedonia qualified for the knockout round. The team then beat Slovenia 68–59, but lost to Russia by 2 points 63–61 after Sergey Monya made a buzzer-beating shot to win the final game of the second round. Macedonia, therefore, finished second in Group F.

For the first time in the national team's history, it reached the knockout stage where it defeated host country Lithuania 67–65 by 2 points in the quarter-finals. Macedonia then lost to the eventual champion Spain 92–80 in the semi-finals. They then lost again in the third place game to Russia 68–72 and finished in fourth place.

=== 2012 Olympic qualifying tournament ===
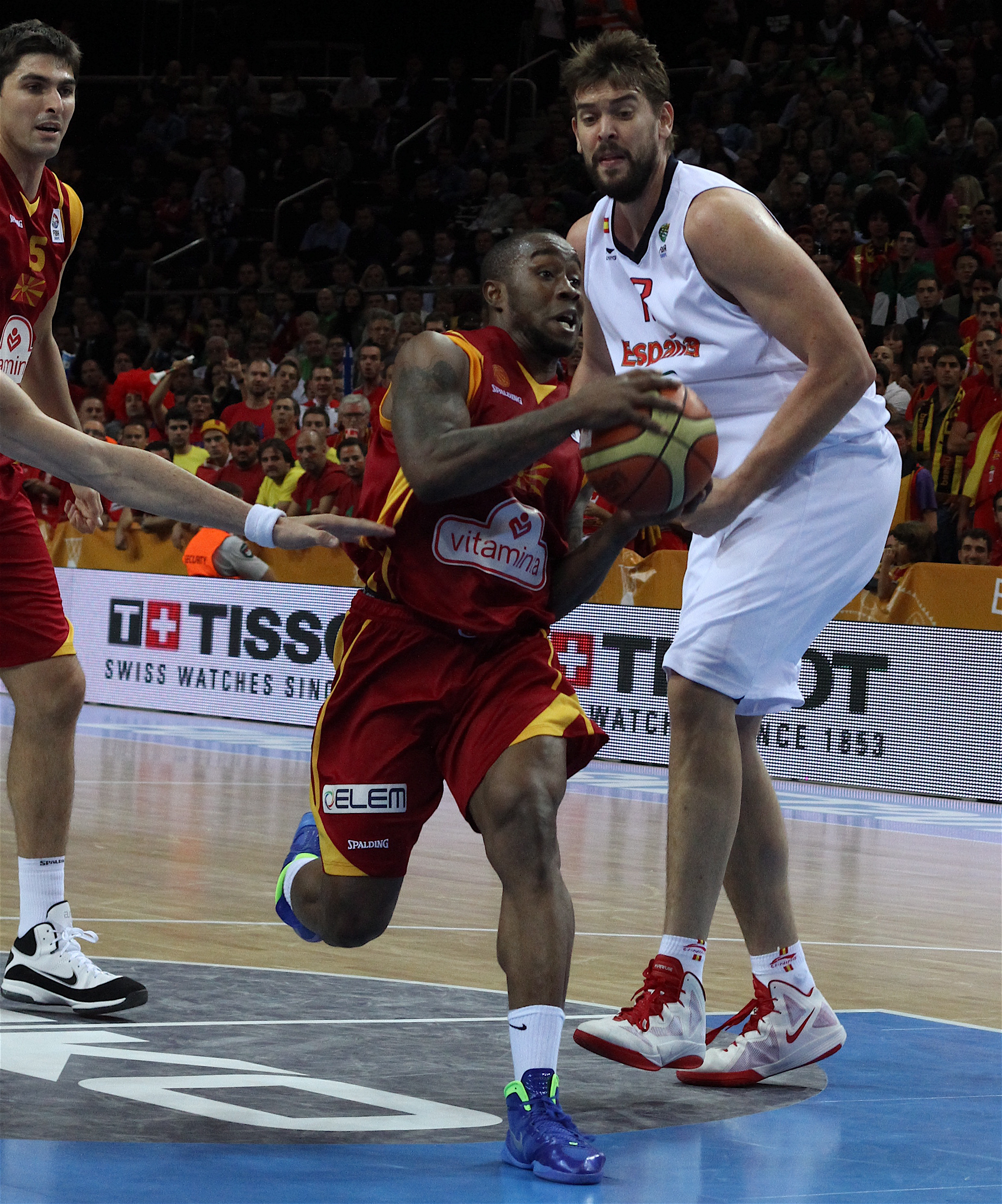
McCalebb with Macedonia in 2011

By finishing in 4th place at EuroBasket 2011, Macedonia qualified for the 2012 FIBA Olympic Qualifying Tournament. They were drawn into Group D along with Angola and New Zealand. In the first game against Angola, Macedonia came out non-aggressive in the 1st half falling to a 13 pt deficit 40–53 at halftime. During most of the match, the top Macedonian players showed fatigue due to the grueling playoff matches they had played for their club teams. In addition, Macedonia came out with a strong 4th quarter, eventually losing by a margin of 4 points, with the final score being 84–88 Angola. Top scorers for Macedonia against Angola were Pero Antic with 17, and Bo McCalebb with 21. On the next match day, which was the day after with less than 24 hours of rest, Macedonia came out a lot stronger in the 1st quarter with a strong lead that carried over the entire game. Eventually, New Zealand could not recover, and fell to Macedonia with a final score of 84–62. Leading scorers for the game were Todor Gecevski with 16, Antic with 17, and McCalebb with 23.

The Macedonian players got much needed rest before the quarterfinals, which would begin two days later on 6 July 2012. The team, following the 68–64 victory by New Zealand over Angola, won Group D and its opponent in the quarterfinals was to be the Group C runner-up, Dominican Republic. Macedonia lost the game 86–76, though the team had a 13-point lead at halftime. The lost eliminated the national team from qualifying for the 2012 Olympic Games.

=== EuroBasket 2013 ===
By participating at the 2012 FIBA World Olympic Qualifying Tournament, Macedonia qualified for EuroBasket 2013 in Slovenia. In a disappointing campaign, Macedonia did not manage to repeat the success from the previous Eurobasket, having one victory in five matches in their preliminary Group B against Serbia 89–75, which was good enough only for the last place in the group stage and 21st overall. The first game of the Eurobasket against Montenegro was particularly demoralizing, as the Montenegrins won 81–80 in controversial fashion, after the referees didn't call interference on the basket during Gjorgji Čekovski's last second game winning attempt, despite the fact that one of the Montenegrin players got his hand trapped in the net. Macedonia's best performers were once again McCalebb and Antić, with 17.6 and 13.8 points per game, respectively. After the tournament, several of the Macedonian veteran players, led by captain Pero Antić, announced their retirement from the national team.

=== EuroBasket 2015 ===
At the EuroBasket 2015 there were not high expectations for Macedonia, due to their poor performance at their last EuroBasket appearance in 2013. In their first match against Greece they were thoroughly manhandled throughout as they were defeated 65-85. Looking for their first victory heading in to their second match of the tournament they went up against the Netherlands. The outcome was different this time, as the national team played with more energy and heart and pulled out an 78-71 win. Unfortunately, that would wind up being the only win for Macedonia, as they finished with an 1-4 record and a lousy 19th place at the event.

=== EuroBasket 2017 ===
Qualifiers

Pos	Team	Pld	W	L	PF	PA	PD	Pts	Qualification
1	Hungary	6	6	0	480	413	+67	12	EuroBasket 2017
2	Great Britain	6	3	3	512	479	+33	9	EuroBasket 2017
3	Macedonia	6	2	4	439	473	−34	8	
4	Luxembourg	6	1	5	432	498	−66	7	

Source: FIBA
Rules for classification: 1) Points; 2) Head-to-head results; 3) Points difference; 4) Points scored.

=== FIBA World Cup 2019 ===
Since 12 February 2019, the national team participate as North Macedonia. The national team took part in the 2019 FIBA World Cup Pre-Qualifiers, but were eliminated after posting a 1–3 record in their group.

=== EuroBasket 2022 ===
The team went through EuroBasket 2022 qualifiers for the chance to qualify to the EuroBasket.They didn't make it finishing third with score 2-4.

Pos	Team	Pld	W	L	PF	PA	PD	Pts	Qualification
1	Italy	6	4	2	511	487	+24	10 (Note: Italy 153–130 Russia)	EuroBasket 2022 as host
2	Russia (Note: On 20 May 2022, FIBA suspended Russia from international competitions due to the 2022 Russian invasion of Ukraine.)	6	4	2	460	405	+55	10	Disqualified
3	Estonia	6	2	4	459	505	−46	8 (Note: Estonia 165–158 North Macedonia)	EuroBasket 2022
4	North Macedonia	6	2	4	473	506	−33	8	

Source: FIBA
Rules for classification: 1) Points; 2) Head-to-head; 3) Points difference; 4) Points scored.

=== FIBA World Cup 2023 ===
Qualifiers

Pos	Team	Pld	W	L	PF	PA	PD	Pts	Qualification	ESP	GEO	UKR	MKD
1	Spain	6	5	1	504	402	+102	11	Second round (Group L)	—	89–61	88–74	80–44
2	Georgia	6	4	2	467	462	+5	10	Second round (Group L)	82–76 (OT)	—	88–83	91–70
3	Ukraine	6	3	3	463	448	+15	9	Second round (Group L)	76–77	79–66	—	78–61
4	North Macedonia	6	0	6	373	495	−122	6		65–94	65–79	68–73	—

Source: FIBA
Rules for classification: 1) Points; 2) Head-to-head results; 3) Points difference; 4) Points scored.

=== 2024 Olympic Qualifying Tournament ===
Pos	Team	Pld	W	L	PF	PA	PD	Pts	Qualification
1	Israel	3	2	1	231	199	+32	5 (Note: Tied on head to head points. Head to head points difference: Israel +11, Estonia −1, Czech Republic −10.)	Semi-finals
2	Estonia (H)	3	2	1	224	201	+23	5	Semi-finals
3	Czech Republic	3	2	1	238	236	+2	5	
4	North Macedonia	3	0	3	206	263	−57	3	

Source: FIBA
Rules for classification: 1) points; 2) head-to-head points; 3) head-to-head points difference; 4) head-to-head number of points scored.
(H) Hosts

=== EuroBasket 2025 ===
Again same as 2022 the qualifiers for EuroBasket 2025 qualifiers they didn't make it , ending third with same score 2-4.

Pos	Team	Pld	W	L	PF	PA	PD	Pts	Qualification
1	Lithuania	6	5	1	482	391	+91	11	EuroBasket 2025
2	Estonia	6	4	2	466	441	+25	10	EuroBasket 2025
3	North Macedonia	6	2	4	457	479	−22	8	
4	Poland	6	1	5	423	517	−94	7	EuroBasket 2025 as host

Source: FIBA
Rules for classification: 1) Points; 2) Head-to-head; 3) Points difference; 4) Points scored.

== Competitive record ==
=== FIBA World Cup ===
(Socialist Republic of Macedonia) (Socialist Federal Republic of Yugoslavia) 1950(10),1954(11),1963(2),1967(2),1970(1) 1974(2),1978(1),1982(3),1986(3),1990(1)

World Cup					Qualification		
Year	Position	Pld	W	L	Pld	W	L
1950 to 1990	Within Yugoslavia				Within Yugoslavia		
(Canada) 1994	Did not enter				Did not enter		
(Greece) 1998	Did not enter				Did not qualify for EuroBasket		
(United States) 2002	Did not enter				Did not qualify for EuroBasket		
(Japan) 2006	Did not enter				Did not qualify for EuroBasket		
(Turkey) 2010	Did not qualify				EuroBasket served as qualifiers		
(Spain) 2014	Did not qualify				EuroBasket served as qualifiers		
(China) 2019	Did not qualify				4	1	3
(Philippines) (Japan) (Indonesia) 2023	Did not qualify				10	2	8
(Qatar) 2027	Did not qualify				4	0	4
(France) 2031	To be determined				To be determined		
Total	0/5				18	3	15

=== Olympic Games ===
(Socialist Republic of Macedonia) (Socialist Federal Republic of Yugoslavia) 1960(6),1964(7),1968(2) 1972(5),1976(2),1980(1),1984(3),1988(2)

Olympic Games					Qualifying		
Year	Position	Pld	W	L	Pld	W	L
1948 to 1988	Within Yugoslavia				Within Yugoslavia		
(Spain) 1992	Did not enter				Did not enter		
(United States) 1996	Could not participate				Could not participate		
(Australia) 2000	Did not qualify				EuroBasket served as qualifiers		
(Greece) 2004	Did not enter				Did not qualify for EuroBasket		
(China) 2008	Did not enter				Did not qualify for EuroBasket		
(United Kingdom) 2012	Did not qualify				3	1	2
(Brazil) 2016	Did not qualify				EuroBasket served as qualifiers		
(Japan) 2020	Did not enter				Did not qualify for FIBA World Cup		
(France) 2024	Did not qualify				3	0	3
(United States) 2028	To be determined				To be determined		
Total	0/4				6	1	5

=== EuroBasket ===
(Socialist Republic of Macedonia) (Socialist Federal Republic of Yugoslavia) 1947(13),1953(6),1955(8),1957(6),1959(9),1961(2) 1963(3),1965(2),1967(9),1969(2),1971(2),1973(1),1975(1),1977(1) 1979(3),1981(2),1983(7),1985(7),1987(3),1989(1),1991(1)

EuroBasket					Qualification		
Year	Position	Pld	W	L	Pld	W	L
1947 to 1991	Within Yugoslavia				Within Yugoslavia		
(Germany) 1993	Did not qualify				3	0	3
(Greece) 1995	Banned				Banned		
(Spain) 1997	Did not qualify				15	8	7
(France) 1999	13th	3	0	3	10	8	2
(Turkey) 2001	Did not qualify				10	6	4
(Sweden) 2003	Did not qualify				10	4	6
(Serbia and Montenegro) 2005	Division B				8	7	1
(Spain) 2007	Did not qualify				12	7	5
(Poland) 2009	9th	6	2	4	6	4	2
(Lithuania) 2011	4th	11	7	4	8	5	3
(Slovenia) 2013	21st	5	1	4	Direct qualification		
(France) (Croatia) (Germany) (Latvia) 2015	19th	5	1	4	6	5	1
(Finland) (Israel) (Romania) (Turkey) 2017	Did not qualify				6	2	4
(Czech Republic) (Georgia (country)) (Italy) (Germany) 2022	Did not qualify				14	8	6
(Cyprus) (Finland) (Poland) (Latvia) 2025	Did not qualify				12	7	5
(Estonia) (Greece) (Slovenia) (Spain) 2029	To be determined				To be determined		
Total	5/13	30	11	19	120	71	49

=== Minor Tournaments ===
- Yugoslav Basketball tournament
  - 4 th place: 1945

== Team image ==
=== Home ground ===
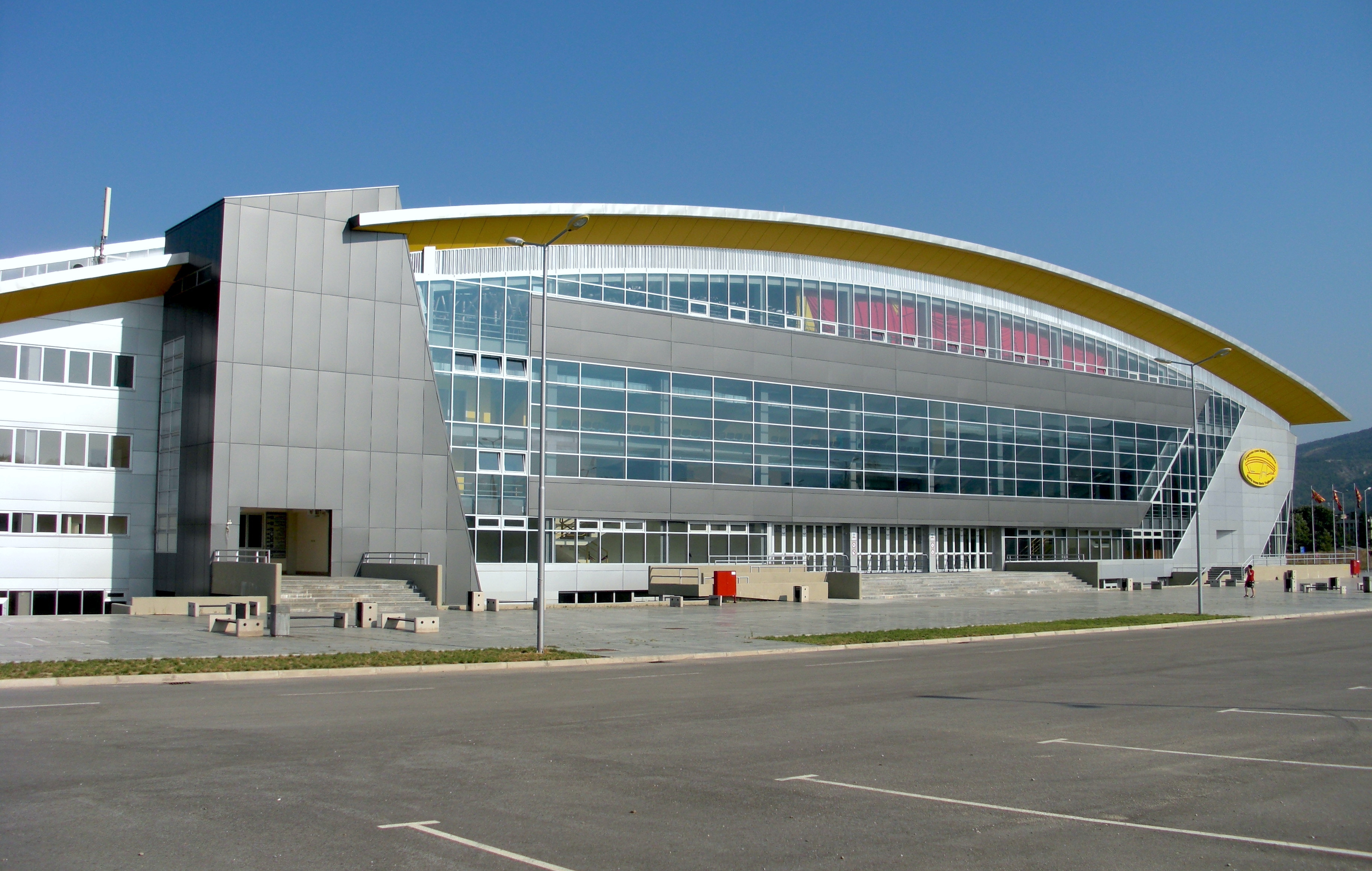
Boris Trajkovski Sports Arena in Skopje.

The BTSC – Boris Trajkovski Sports Center Macedonian: Спортски центар Борис Трајковски, Skopje is a multi-functional indoor sports arena. It is located in the Karpoš Municipality of Skopje, Macedonia. It is named after the former president, Boris Trajkovski. Its capacity is 10,000. Within the complex, there is an Olympic size swimming pool, Hotel Alexander Palace, a water park and an ice skating rink.

The arena is a home-ground of the Macedonian basketball team (men and women). The venue also contains four restaurants and a sports bar.

=== Colors ===
National kit colors are colors of the flag which are also Spread on the Presidential Shield. Noble Red blood and Golden Yellow Sun Devine "ILI".

== Team ==
=== Current roster ===
Team for EuroBasket 2029 qualification game against Austria on August 30, 2026.

North Macedonia men's national basketball team roster
Players
Coaches

Pos.	No.	Name	Age – Date of birth	Height	Club	Ctr.
G/F	8	Vojdan Stojanovski (C)	38 – 9 December 1987	1.95 m (6 ft 5 in)	MZT Skopje	(North Macedonia)
F	11	Stojan Gjuroski	34 – 6 November 1991	2.03 m (6 ft 8 in)	Kumanovo	(North Macedonia)
G/F	10	Adem Mekić	30 – 28 December 1995	1.97 m (6 ft 6 in)	Zadar	(Croatia)
G	7	Nenad Dimitrijević	28 – 23 February 1998	1.90 m (6 ft 3 in)	Aris	(Greece)
G/F	25	Viktor Efremovski	27 – 21 October 1998	1.94 m (6 ft 4 in)	Rabotnički	(North Macedonia)
C	5	Moses Wright	27 – 23 December 1998	2.06 m (6 ft 9 in)	Olimpia Milano	(Italy)
G	33	Luka Stojanovski	26 – 4 February 2000	1.91 m (6 ft 3 in)	MZT Skopje	(North Macedonia)
PF	6	Valmir Kakruki	25 – 20 September 2000	2.04 m (6 ft 8 in)	Bashkimi	(Kosovo)
F	27	Lejson Zeqiri	24 – 17 September 2001	2.04 m (6 ft 8 in)	Bashkimi	(Kosovo)
PG	00	Viktor Tashovski	24 – 22 November 2001	1.82 m (6 ft 0 in)	Dubrovnik	(Croatia)
G	77	Rezart Memedi	23 – 1 May 2003	1.92 m (6 ft 4 in)	Bora	(Kosovo)
F	26	Toma Stojanoski	22 – 14 June 2004	1.98 m (6 ft 6 in)	TFT	(North Macedonia)

Head Coach

- (Spain) Josep Maria Berrocal

Assistant Coaches

- (North Macedonia) Gjorgi Kočov
- (North Macedonia) Nikola Velev

Legend

- Club – describes last
  team before the competition
- Age – describes age
  on 12 July 2026

The following list is of active players who have been called up by the national team in the last year.

Players recently called up roster
Players
Coaches

Pos.	No.	Name	Age – Date of birth	Height	Club	Ctr.
G	9	Andrej Magdevski (injured)	30 – 14 January 1996	1.92 m (6 ft 4 in)	MZT Skopje	(North Macedonia)
PG	5	Kristijan Nikolov (injured)	29 – 15 October 1996	1.87 m (6 ft 2 in)	Rabotnički	(North Macedonia)
G/F	20	Damjan Robev	29 – 10 April 1997	1.93 m (6 ft 4 in)	Rabotnički	(North Macedonia)
F/C	77	Nate Sestina	29 – 12 May 1997	2.06 m (6 ft 9 in)	ASVEL	(France)
F/C	13	Andrej Maslinko (injured)	29 – 20 May 1997	2.08 m (6 ft 10 in)	MZT Skopje	(North Macedonia)
PF	99	Strahil Nikolov	26 – 17 July 2000	2.00 m (6 ft 7 in)	TFT	(North Macedonia)
G	0	Omari Moore	25 – 18 September 2000	1.98 m (6 ft 6 in)	Valencia	(Spain)
SF	23	Andrej Jakimovski (injured)	25 – 18 March 2001	2.02 m (6 ft 8 in)	Napoli	(Italy)
G/F	5	Marko Milovanović	24 – 18 January 2002	1.95 m (6 ft 5 in)	Foppiani & Fidenza	(Italy)
G	19	Luka Savićević	24 – 19 February 2002	1.91 m (6 ft 3 in)	Feniks	(North Macedonia)
G	4	Marin Petkov	23 – 20 February 2003	1.92 m (6 ft 4 in)	Ohio Bobcats men's basketball	(United States)
F	12	Amar Hot	22 – 17 August 2003	2.01 m (6 ft 7 in)	Madžari	(North Macedonia)
G	1	Andrej Mitrevski	22 – 17 September 2003	1.92 m (6 ft 4 in)	Pacific Tigers men's basketball	(United States)
C	15	Teodor Simikj	22 – 4 February 2004	2.14 m (7 ft 0 in)	Kozuv	(North Macedonia)
SG	2	Petar Boshaleski (injured)	22 – 8 July 2004	1.92 m (6 ft 4 in)	MZT Skopje	(North Macedonia)
PG	1	Rubin Stefanov	21 – 3 May 2005	1.91 m (6 ft 3 in)	Angeli	(North Macedonia)
F	34	Pavel Ivanov	21 – 17 June 2005	2.02 m (6 ft 8 in)	Central Oklahoma Bronchos	(United States)
C	1	Marko Lukanoski	20 – 16 March 2006	2.09 m (6 ft 10 in)	Madžari	(North Macedonia)

=== Depth chart ===
Pos.	Starting 5	Bench 1	Bench 2
C	Moses Wright	Valmir Kakruki
PF	Stojan Gjuroski	Lejson Zeqiri	Toma Stojanoski
SF	Adem Mekic	Vojdan Stojanovski
SG	Viktor Efremovski	Luka Stojanovski	Rezart Memedi
PG	Nenad Dimitrijevic	Viktor Tashovski

=== Notable players ===
- Petar Naumoski – (1995–2002)
- Vrbica Stefanov – (1995–2009)
- Pero Blaževski – (1995–2009)
- Todor Gecevski – (1996–2013)
- Pero Antić – (2002–2013)
- Bo McCalebb – (2010–2013)
- Vlado Ilievski – (1998–2015)
- Predrag Samardžiski – (2005–2015)
- Gjorgji Čekovski – (1999–2017)
- Damjan Stojanovski – (2009–2024)
- Vojdan Stojanovski – (2008– )
- Nenad Dimitrijević - (2017– )

=== Coaching history ===
- (North Macedonia) Aleksandar Knjazev – (1993–1994)
- (North Macedonia) Blagoja Georgievski – (1995–1996)
- (North Macedonia) Zare Markovski – (1997–1999)
- (North Macedonia) Marin Dokuzovski – (1999–2001)
- (North Macedonia) Jordančo Davitkov – (2001–2007)
- (Serbia) Jovica Arsić – (2007–2009)
- (North Macedonia) Marin Dokuzovski – (2010–2011)
- (North Macedonia) Marjan Lazovski – (2012)
- (Slovenia) Aleš Pipan – (2013)
- (Serbia) Aleksandar Džikić – (2014)
- (North Macedonia) Marjan Srbinovski – (2015)
- (Serbia) Dragan Raca – (2016)
- (North Macedonia) Jordančo Davitkov – (2017–2019)
- (North Macedonia) Aleksandar Todorov – (2020–2021)
- (Bosnia and Herzegovina) Dragan Bajić – (2021–2022)
- (North Macedonia) Aleksandar Jončevski – (2023–2025)
- (North Macedonia) Marjan Ilievski – (2025)
- (Spain) Josep Maria Berrocal – (2026–present)

=== Past rosters ===
1999 EuroBasket: finished 13th among 16 teams

4 Vrbica Stefanov, 5 Vlado Ilievski, 6 Gjorgji Čekovski, 7 Mirza Kurtović, 8 Marjan Srbinovski, 9 Igor Mihajlovski, 10 Petar Naumoski, 11 Todor Gečevski, 12 Dejan Jovanovski, 13 Srdjan Stanković, 14 Pero Blaževski, 15 Dušan Bocevski (Coach: Zare Markovski)

2009 EuroBasket: finished 9th among 16 teams

4 Vrbica Stefanov, 5 Dimitar Mirakovski, 6 Darko Sokolov, 7 Riste Stefanov, 8 Vojdan Stojanovski, 9 Pero Blaževski, 10 Dime Tasovski, 11 Todor Gečevski, 12 Pero Antić, 13 Damjan Stojanovski, 14 Jeremiah Massey, 15 Predrag Samardžiski (Coach: Jovica Arsić)

2011 EuroBasket: finished 4th among 24 teams

4 Dimitar Mirakovski, 5 Vlado Ilievski, 6 Darko Sokolov, 7 Bo McCalebb, 8 Vojdan Stojanovski, 9 Damjan Stojanovski, 10 Marko Simonovski, 11 Todor Gečevski, 12 Pero Antic, 13 Ivica Dimcevski, 14 Gjorgji Čekovski, 15 Predrag Samardžiski (Coach: Marin Dokuzovski)

2013 EuroBasket: finished 21st among 24 teams

4 Aleksandar Kostoski, 5 Vlado Ilievski. 6 Darko Sokolov, 7 Bo McCalebb, 8 Vojdan Stojanovski, 9 Damjan Stojanovski, 10 Vladimir Brčkov, 11 Todor Gečevski, 12 Pero Antić, 13 Stojan Gjuroski, 14 Gjorgji Čekovski, 15 Predrag Samardžiski (Coach: Aleš Pipan)

2015 EuroBasket: finished 19th among 24 teams

4 Vladimir Brčkov, 5 Vlado Ilievski. 6 Darko Sokolov, 7 Aleksandar Kostoski, 8 Vojdan Stojanovski, 9 Damjan Stojanovski, 10 Marko Simonovski, 11 Ljubomir Mladenovski, 12 Bojan Trajkovski, 13 Stojan Gjuroski, 14 Richard Hendrix, 15 Predrag Samardžiski (Coach: Marjan Srbinovski)

== Results and fixtures ==
Win Loss

=== 2025 ===
27 November 2025 EuroBasket 2029 pre-qualifiers – 1st round	North Macedonia	87–49	Azerbaijan	Skopje, North Macedonia
19:00 (UTC+1)	Scoring by quarter: 22–13, 18–8, 23–16, 24–12
	Pts: Jakimovski 25; Rebs: Jakimovski, Stojanovski 11; Asts: Moore 9	Boxscore	Pts: Hamzayev 12; Rebs: S. Donat 13; Asts: K. Mammadov 5	Arena: SRC Kale; Attendance: 800; Referees: Łukasz Jankowski (POL), Polat Parlak (TUR), Sava Ćetković (MNE)

30 November 2025 EuroBasket 2029 pre-qualifiers – 1st round	Ireland	76–88	North Macedonia	Dublin, Ireland
17:00 (UTC+0)	Scoring by quarter: 27–20, 13–22, 22–19, 14–27
	Pts: Alajiki 26; Rebs: Alajiki 10; Asts: Badmus 3	Boxscore	Pts: Jakimovski 26; Rebs: Wiley 9 Asts: Jakimovski, Mekić 4	Arena: National Basketball Arena; Attendance: 2,000; Referees: Marek Mikulčík (SVK), Martin Van Hoye (BEL), Jānis Rozenbergs (LAT)

=== 2026 ===
27 February 2026 EuroBasket 2029 pre-qualifiers – 1st round	North Macedonia	79–70	Luxembourg	Skopje, North Macedonia
18:00 (UTC+1)	Scoring by quarter: 25–17, 19–15, 15–17, 20–21
	Pts: Jakimovski 17; Rebs: Happ 14; Asts: Petkov 7	Boxscore	Pts: Kovac 20; Rebs: Kovac 11; Asts: Gutenkauf 4	Arena: Skopje City Park Sports Hall; Attendance: 1,500; Referees: Peter Ženiš (SVK), Duhan Köyiçi (TUR), Mladen Lučić (MNE)

2 March 2026 EuroBasket 2029 pre-qualifiers – 1st round	Azerbaijan	70–78	North Macedonia	Baku, Azerbaijan
20:00 (UTC+4)	Scoring by quarter: 28–19, 16–18, 12–21, 14–20
	Pts: Van Beck 23; Rebs: S. Donat 8 Asts: K. Mammadov 4	Boxscore	Pts: Jakimovski 22; Rebs: Happ 9 Asts: Magdevski 7	Arena: Baku Sports Palace; Attendance: 1,300; Referees: Kirile Tvauri (GEO), Tomasz Langowski (POL), Emmanouil Tsolakos (GRE)

2 July 2026 EuroBasket 2029 pre-qualifiers – 1st round	North Macedonia	77–56	Ireland	Skopje, North Macedonia
18:00 (UTC+2)	Scoring by quarter: 23–16, 15–11, 21–10, 18–19
	Pts: Jakimovski 19; Rebs: Jakimovski 13; Asts: Tashovski 5	Boxscore	Pts: Alajiki 20; Rebs: Alajiki 11; Asts: Flood 9	Arena: Lazar Lečić Sports Hall; Attendance: 500; Referees: Ali Şakacı (TUR), Alessandro Perciavalle (ITA), Gabrielius Simanavičius (LTU)

5 July 2026 EuroBasket 2029 pre-qualifiers – 1st round	Luxembourg	66–80	North Macedonia	Luxembourg City, Luxembourg
16:00 (UTC+2)	Scoring by quarter: 15–23, 12–23, 22–17, 17–17
	Pts: Kovac 17; Rebs: Grosber 9 Asts: Gutenkauf, Kovac 4	Boxscore	Pts: Sestina 18; Rebs: Gjuroski, Tashovski 7 Asts: Tashovski 7	Arena: d'Coque; Attendance: 2,000; Referees: Peter Ženiš (SVK), Diogo Martins (POR), Matteo Lucotti (ITA)

30 August 2026 EuroBasket 2029 pre-qualifiers – 2nd round	Austria	59–91	North Macedonia	Vienna, Austria
16:05 (UTC+2)	Scoring by quarter: 14–30, 16–19, 14–16, 15–26
	Pts: three players 9 Rebs: Dietz, Kapic 7 Asts: Vujošević 7	Boxscore	Pts: Efremovski 17; Rebs: Dimitrijević 14; Asts: Dimitrijević 11	Arena: Sport Arena Wien; Attendance: 1,100; Referees: Ilias Karapanos (GRE), Łukasz Jankowski (POL), Viktor Nagy (HUN)

26 November 2026 EuroBasket 2029 pre-qualifiers – 2nd round	North Macedonia	vs.	Cyprus	Skopje, North Macedonia
18:00 (UTC+1)
		Boxscore		Arena: Lazar Lečić Sports Hall

=== 2027 ===
25 February 2027 EuroBasket 2029 pre-qualifiers – 2nd round	North Macedonia	vs.	Austria	North Macedonia
--:-- (UTC+1)
		Boxscore

28 February 2027 EuroBasket 2029 pre-qualifiers – 2nd round	Cyprus	vs.	North Macedonia	Cyprus
--:-- (UTC+2)
		Boxscore

== Statistics ==
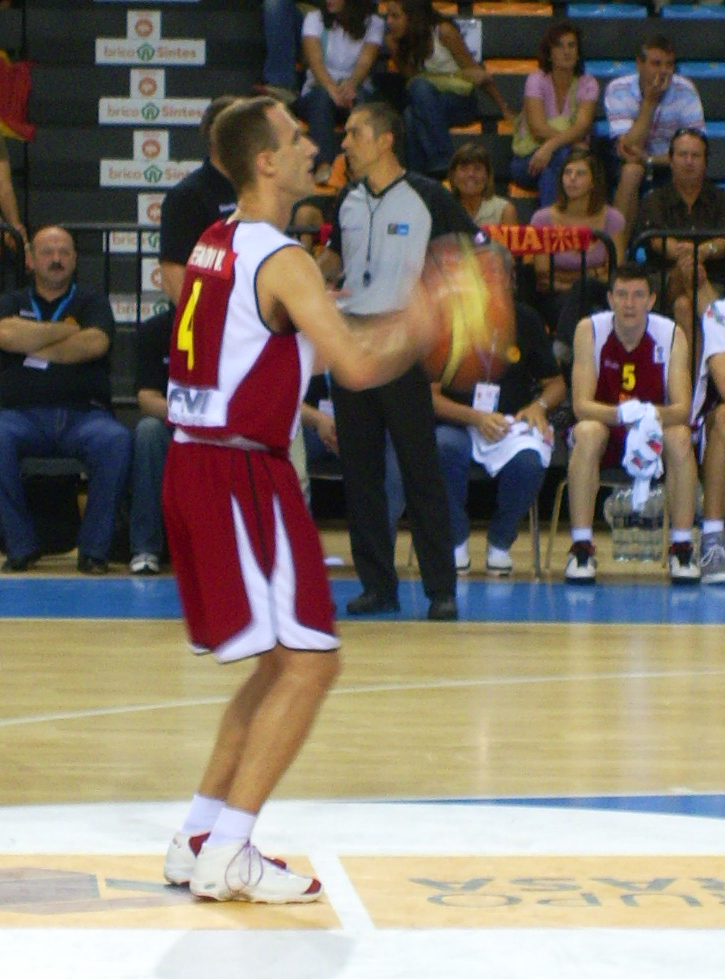
Vrbica Stefanov is one of the leaders in games played and points scored for the national team.

=== Most games played ===
Rank	Name	NT Career	Games
1	**Vojdan Stojanovski**	2008 –	99
2	Todor Gečevski	1996–2013	89
3	Vrbica Stefanov	1995–2009	66
4	Damjan Stojanovski	2009–2024	61
5	Gjorgji Čekovski	1999–2017	60
6	**Stojan Gjuroski**	2013 –	60
7	Pero Blaževski	1995–2009	54
8	Predrag Samardžiski	2005–2015	52
9	**Andrej Magdevski**	2014 –	51
10	Pero Antić	2002–2013	49

=== All time points scored ===
Rank	Name	NT Career	Total Points	Caps	Points per game
1	Petar Naumoski	1995–2002	989	42	23.5
2	Vrbica Stefanov	1995–2009	947	66	14.3
3	**Vojdan Stojanovski**	2008 –	905	92	9.8
4	Todor Gečevski	1996–2013	891	89	10.0
5	Pero Antić	2002–2013	605	49	12.3
6	Bo McCalebb	2010–2013	543	25	21.7
7	Vlado Ilievski	1998–2015	500	47	10.6
8	Dejan Jovanovski	1995–2002	394	38	10.4
9	Damjan Stojanovski	2009–2024	338	61	5.5
10	**Stojan Gjuroski**	2013 –	321	60	5.4

- * Active NT players are listed in bold
- * Official FIBA games excluding Friendly games

=== Leader in points per game ===
Name	PPG	Competition
Petar Naumoski	29.4	EuroBasket 1997 qualification
Petar Naumoski	30.5	EuroBasket 1999 qualification
Petar Naumoski	15.0	EuroBasket 1999
Vrbica Stefanov	21.2	EuroBasket 2001 qualification
Petar Naumoski	19.3	EuroBasket 2003 qualification
Vrbica Stefanov / Pero Antić	15.2	EuroBasket 2005 Division B
Vrbica Stefanov	19.0	EuroBasket 2007 qualification
Vrbica Stefanov	15.0	EuroBasket 2009 qualification
Pero Antić	12.5	EuroBasket 2009
Bo McCalebb	23.5	EuroBasket 2011 qualification
Bo McCalebb	21.4	EuroBasket 2011
Bo McCalebb	26.3	2012 Olympic Qualifying
Bo McCalebb	17.6	EuroBasket 2013
Bojan Trajkovski	11.3	EuroBasket 2015 qualification
Aleksandar Kostoski	9.8	EuroBasket 2015
Vojdan Stojanovski	17.2	EuroBasket 2017 qualification
Jordan Theodore	19.5	2019 World Cup Pre-Qualifiers
Vojdan Stojanovski	15.2	EuroBasket 2021 qualification Round 1, 2 & 3
Nenad Dimitrijević	25.0	World Cup 2023 Qualifiers
T. J. Shorts	20.0	2024 Olympic Qualifiers
Nenad Dimitrijević	25.7	EuroBasket 2025 Qualifiers
Jacob Wiley	21.3	2027 FIBA Basketball World Cup qualification (Europe)
**Andrej Jakimovski**	21.8	EuroBasket 2029 qualification

== See also ==
- North Macedonia women's national basketball team
- North Macedonia men's national under-20 basketball team
- North Macedonia men's national under-18 basketball team
- North Macedonia men's national under-16 basketball team
