= Borče Daskalovski =

Macedonian basketball player and coach

Personal information
- Born: August 22, 1983 (age 43) Skopje, SFR Yugoslavia, SR Macedonia

Career information
- Playing career: 2001–2009
- Position: Shooting guard
- Coaching career: 2009–present

Career history

Playing
- 2001–2003: Balkan Steel
- 2003–2006: Vardar
- 2006–2007: Pelister
- 2007: Feni Industries
- 2007–2009: Vardar

Coaching
- 2009–2012: Vardar
- 2014–2017: Karpoš Sokoli (assistant)
- 2017: Karpoš Sokoli
- 2019–2020: Astana (assistant)
- 2020–2021: MZT Skopje 2
- 2023–2024: Kožuv
- 2025–2026: Pelister

Borče Daskalovski (born August 22, 1983) is a former Macedonian professional basketball player, and currently coach.

On 4 July 2017, he became a head coach of Karpoš Sokoli.
