= Pero Blazevski =

Macedonian basketball player

Personal information
- Born: September 28, 1972 (age 54) Skopje, SR Macedonia, SFR Yugoslavia
- Listed height: 1.99 m (6 ft 6 in)

Career information
- Playing career: 1990–2013
- Position: Small forward
- Coaching career: 2014–present

Career history

Playing
- 1990–1995: Godel Rabotnički
- 1995–1997: MZT Skopje
- 1997–1998: Rabotnički
- 1998–2000: MZT Skopje
- 2000–2001: Nikol Fert
- 2001–2002: Kumanovo
- 2002–2003: Lusitânia
- 2003–2004: Prishtina
- 2004–2005: Helios Domžale
- 2005–2006: Mabetex
- 2006–2007: Kastrioti Ferizaj
- 2007–2008: Vardar
- 2008–2009: MZT Skopje Aerodrom
- 2009–2010: Vardar Osiguruvanje
- 2010–2011: Rabotnički
- 2011–2012: Torus
- 2012–2013: Kozuv

Coaching
- 2014–2015: Strumica (assistant)
- 2015: Macedonia (assistant)
- 2015–2018: Rabotnički (assistant)
- 2021-2022: MZT Skopje Uni Banka

Career highlights
- 4x Macedonian First League champion (1993, 1994, 1995, 1998); 9x Macedonian Cup winner (1993, 1994, 1996–1999, 2001, 2007, 2011); Siguria Superleague champion (2006)

Pero Blazevski (born September 28, 1972) is a former Macedonian professional basketball player who played for many clubs in Macedonia like MZT Skopje, Rabotnicki, Kumanovo and many more. He was also member of Macedonia national basketball team.
