= Filip Kralevski =

Macedonian basketball player

Personal information
- Born: October 26, 1982 (age 44) Skopje, Macedonia
- Listed height: 2.04 m (6 ft 8 in)
- Position: Power forward

Career history
- 1999–2000: Karpoš Sokoli
- 2000–2002: Rabotnički
- 2002–2008: Vardar
- 2008–2009: MZT Skopje
- 2009–2010: Plejmejker Cubus
- 2010–2014: Vardar Apave

Filip Kralevski (born October 26, 1982) was a Macedonian professional basketball Power forward who last played for Vardar Apave.
