= Vladimir Brčkov =

Macedonian basketball player

Personal information
- Born: December 29, 1989 (age 36) Veles, SR Macedonia, SFR Yugoslavia
- Listed height: 2.00 m (6 ft 7 in)
- Listed weight: 120 kg (265 lb)

Career information
- Playing career: 2005–present
- Position: Small forward

Career history
- 2005–2008: Ovče Pole
- 2008: Rabotnički
- 2008–2009: Torus
- 2009–2013: Feni Industries
- 2013–2014: Rabotnički
- 2014–2016: Kožuv
- 2016–2017: Strumica
- 2017–2018: Tirana
- 2019–2021: Borec

Career highlights
- Macedonian League (2011); EUROHOLD Balkan League (2011)

Vladimir Brčkov (Macedonian: Владимир Брчков) (born December 29, 1989) is a former Macedonian professional basketball player. He played last for Borec of Macedonian Second League. He is also a member of the Macedonian national basketball team.

== Macedonian national team ==
Brckov is also a member of the North Macedonia men's national basketball team. He competed with the team at Eurobasket 2013.
