= Lejson Zeqiri =

Macedonian-Kosovan basketball player

No. 27 – Bashkimi
- Position: Power forward
- League: Kosovo Basketball Superleague

Personal information
- Born: 17 September 2001 (age 25) Skopje, Macedonia
- Listed height: 2.03 m (6 ft 8 in)

Career information
- Playing career: 2020–present

Career history
- 2020: Gostivar
- 2020–2021: MZT Skopje 2
- 2021–2023: Prishtina
- 2023–present: Bashkimi

Career highlights
- Kosovo Supercup winner (2022)

Lejson Zeqiri (born 17 September 2001) is a Macedonian-Kosovan professional basketball player for Bashkimi of the Kosovo Basketball Superleague. He is a member of the North Macedonia national team.

== Professional career ==
On the 2 August 2021, Zeqiri signed for Prishtina.

In December 2023, Zeqiri signed for Bashkimi.
