= Luka Stojanovski =

Macedonian basketball player

No. 3 – MZT Skopje
- Position: Shooting guard
- League: Macedonian League

Personal information
- Born: February 4, 2000 (age 26) Skopje, Macedonia
- Listed height: 1.90 m (6 ft 3 in)
- Listed weight: 85 kg (187 lb)

Career information
- Playing career: 2018–present

Career history
- 2018–2019: MZT Skopje
- 2019–2022: Akademija FMP
- 2022–2023: Euro Nickel
- 2023–2026: Pelister
- 2026–present: MZT Skopje

Career highlights
- Macedonian First League champion (2019)

Luka Stojanovski (born February 4, 2000) is a Macedonian professional basketball Shooting guard who is currently playing for MZT Skopje of the Macedonian First League.

== Professional career ==
On October 2, 2018, he signed his first professional contract with KK MZT Skopje, He played his first professional season 2018–2019 in ABA League Second Division and Macedonian first league.
