= KK Torus =

- Leagues: Macedonian First League
- Founded: 1999
- Dissolved: 2012
- Arena: Boris Trajkovski Arena (capacity: 6,000)
- Location: Skopje, North Macedonia
- Team colors: Blue and Yellow
Home	Away

KK Torus (Macedonian: КК Торус) was a basketball club based in Skopje, North Macedonia. They played in the Macedonian First League and the Balkan League until the season 2011/2012.

== History ==
The club was founded on 25 May 1999.

Name: KK Torus, KK Torus-SC Boris Trajkovski

== Honours ==
=== Domestic Achievements ===
- Macedonian Cup Finalist - 2010
- Macedonian Cup Semifinals - 2011, 2012
- Macedonian League Semifinals - 2010, 2011

== Notable former players ==
- (North Macedonia) Bojan Trajkovski
- (North Macedonia) Pero Blazevski
- (North Macedonia) Gorjan Markovski
- (North Macedonia) Ivica Dimčevski
- (North Macedonia) Vladimir Brčkov
- (North Macedonia) Jovan Markovski
- (North Macedonia) Aleksandar Kostoski
- (North Macedonia) Nikola Karakolev
- (North Macedonia) Dimitar Karadzovski
- (North Macedonia) Bojan Krstevski
- (North Macedonia) Marjan Janevski
- (North Macedonia) Aleksandar Šterjov
- (United States) Jeremiah Boswell
- (United States) Justin Reynolds
- (United States) Bryan Harrison
- (United States) Karon Bradley
- (Serbia) Nemanja Jelesijević
- (Serbia) Zoran Milović
- (Serbia) Aleksandar Held
- (Serbia) Milan Miljković
- (Serbia) Ilija Milutinović
- (Croatia) Aleksandar Opačić
- (Bosnia and Herzegovina) Igor Tadić

== Technical staff ==
Position	Name	Nationality
Head coach	Marjan Srbinovski	Macedonian
Assistant coach	Dragan Vasilov	Macedonian
President	Vojo Petrov	Macedonian
Sports director	Gordan Petrov	Macedonian
Press Officer	Vlasta Ruzinovska	Macedonian
Club doctor	Goran Andov	Macedonian
Physiotherapist	Gordana Bogucevska	Macedonian
