= Zoran Petkovski =

Macedonian basketball player

Personal information
- Born: August 29, 1978 (age 48) Macedonia
- Died: September 25, 2025
- Listed height: 1.91 m (6 ft 3 in)

Career information
- Playing career: 1995–2014
- Position: Guard
- Coaching career: 2015–present

Career history
- 1995–1999: Pelister
- 1999–2000: Kumanovo
- 2000–2001: Vardar
- 2001–2002: MZT Skopje
- 2004–2005: Soko Štark Sokoli
- 2005–2013: Pelister
- 2013–2014: Radoviš

Zoran Petkovski was a Macedonian professional basketball Guard. He was a coach of Pelister of Macedonian First League.
