= Pavle Nikolov =

Macedonian basketball player and coach (born 1992)

Kozuv
- Position: Coach
- League: Macedonian First League

Personal information
- Born: May 6, 1992 (age 34) Negotino, Macedonia
- Listed height: 1.88 m (6 ft 2 in)
- Listed weight: 205 lb (93 kg)

Career information
- Playing career: 2009–present

Career history

Playing
- 2009–2015: Feni Industries
- 2016: Best Gevgelija

Coaching
- 2017–present: Kožuv

Pavle Nikolov (born May 6, 1992) is a Macedonian basketball player and coach who coaches Kožuv.
