= Marjan Srbinovski =

Macedonian basketball player and coach

Personal information
- Born: December 8, 1974 (age 51) Gostivar, SR Macedonia, SFR Yugoslavia
- Listed height: 1.97 m (6 ft 6 in)

Career information
- Playing career: 1993–2007
- Position: Small forward / shooting guard
- Coaching career: 2011–present

Career history

Playing
- 1993–1994: Gostivar
- 1994–1996: MZT Skopje
- 1996–1997: Nikol Fert
- 1997–1998: Žito Vardar
- 1998–2000: Rabotnički
- 2000–2001: MZT Skopje
- 2001–2002: Kumanovo
- 2002–2004: Zdravlje Leskovac
- 2004–2005: Favoriti
- 2005–2006: Toa Sum Jas
- 2006–2007: Rabotnički

Coaching
- 2007–2011: Rabotnički (assistant)
- 2010–2015: Macedonia (assistant)
- 2011: Rabotnički
- 2011–2012: Torus
- 2012–2014: Kozuv
- 2014–2015: Rabotnički
- 2015: Macedonia
- 2016–2017: Kumanovo
- 2017–2021: Gostivar

Marjan Srbinovski (born December 8, 1974) is a Macedonian basketball coach for Gostivar, of the Macedonian First League.
