= Ljupčo Malinkov =

Macedonian basketball coach

Kozuv
- Position: Head coach
- League: Macedonian First League

Personal information
- Born: June 17, 1983 (age 43) Kavadarci, North Macedonia
- Coaching career: 2024–present

Career history

Coaching
- 2024–2025: KK Gostivar
- 2025–present: KK Kožuv

Ljupčo Malinkov (Macedonian: Љупчо Малинков, born 17 June 1983) is a Macedonian professional basketball coach who serves as the head coach of KK Kožuv in the Macedonian First League.

== Honours ==
- 2017, Macedonian Basketball Cup: Runner-Up
