= Marin Dokuzovski =

Macedonian basketball player and coach

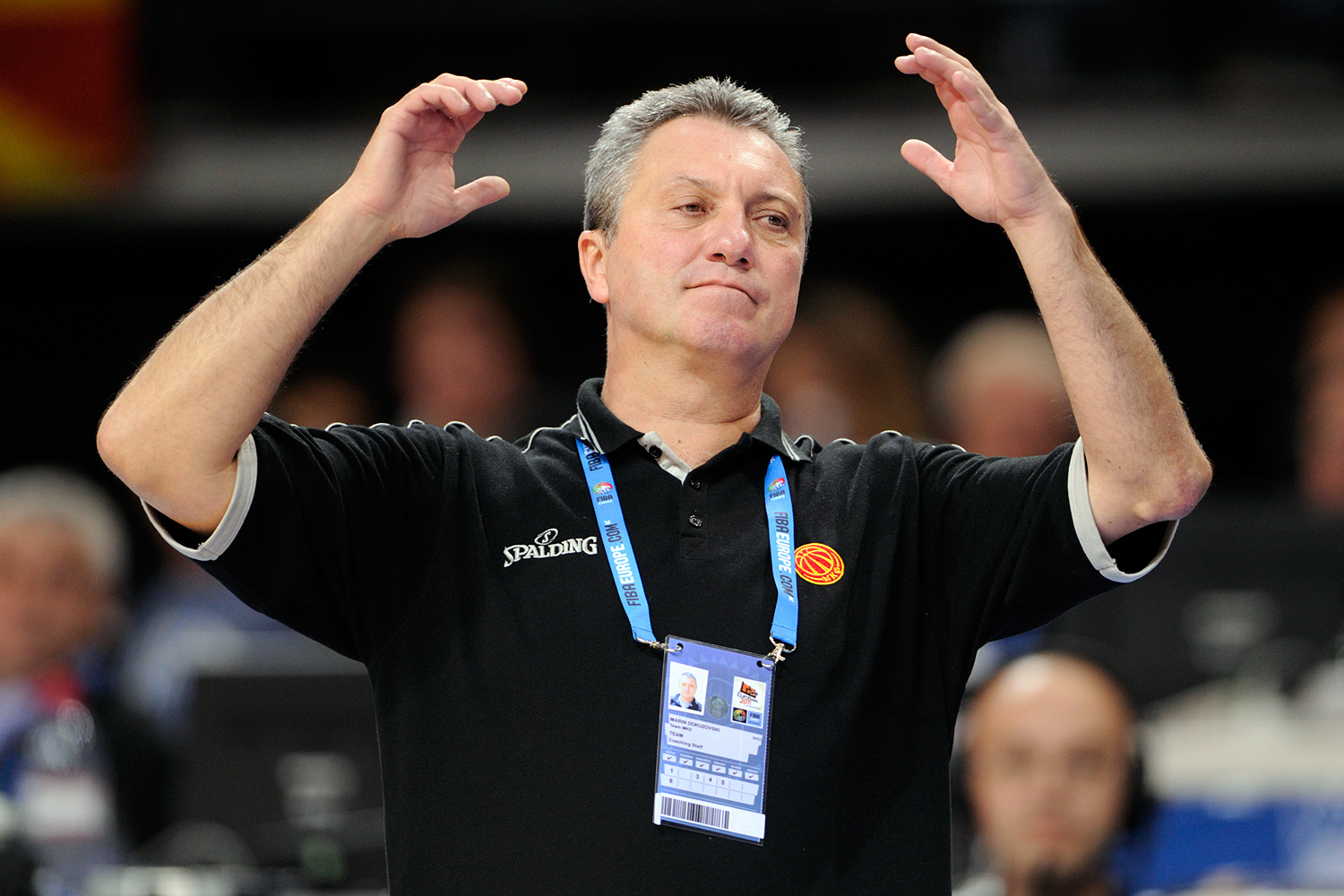
- Dokuzovski on the EuroBasket 2011

Kumanovo
- Position: Head coach

Personal information
- Born: 14 July 1960 (age 66) Skopje, Macedonia, Yugoslavia
- Coaching career: 1989–present

Career history

Coaching
- 1994–1996: Rabotnički
- 1997–2000: Rabotnički
- 2000–2001: MZT Skopje
- 2002: Polo Trejd
- 2003–2004: Rabotnički
- 2004–2006: Lukoil Academic (assistant)
- 2006–2007: Lukoil Academic
- 2007–2009: Rabotnički
- 2009–2011: Macedonia
- 2011: Rabotnički
- 2011–2013: Lukoil Academic
- 2014: Sigal Prishtina
- 2014–2019: Rabotnički
- 2023–present: MKK Kumanovo

Career highlights
- 7× Macedonian League (1995, 1996, 1998, 1999, 2004, 2009, 2018); 3× Macedonian Cup (1998, 2005, 2011); 3× Bulgarian League (2006, 2007, 2012); 3× Bulgarian Basketball Cup (2006, 2007, 2012); Kosovo Basketball Superleague (2014)

Marin Dokuzovski (Macedonian: Марин Докузовски; born 14 July 1960 in Skopje) is a Macedonian professional basketball coach who currently is the head coach of MKK Kumanovo in the Macedonian First League.

== Career ==
Dokuzovski played club basketball at the senior level from 1978 to 1989 with the Yugoslav League club Rabotnički.

Dokuzovski coached in the following clubs: Rabotnički, MZT Skopje, Polo Trejd Strumica, PBC Lukoil Academic and Sigal Prishtina.

== Clubs ==
=== Playing career ===
- 1978-89: KK Rabotnicki: Yugoslav League

=== Head coach ===
- 1989-94: Rabotnički(youth team)
- 1994-96: Rabotnički: Macedonian League
- 1997-00: Rabotnički: Macedonian League
- 2000-01: MZT Skopje: Macedonian League
- 2002: Polo Trejd Strumica: Macedonian League
- 2003-04: Rabotnički: Macedonian League
- 2004-06: Lukoil Academic: Bulgarian League(assistant)
- 2006-07: Lukoil Academic: Bulgarian League
- 2007-09: Rabotnički: Macedonian League
- 2009-11: Macedonia national team
- 2011-13: Lukoil Academic: Bulgarian League
- 2014: Sigal Prishtina: Kosovar League
- 2014-19: Rabotnički: Macedonian League

== Head coaching career with Macedonian national teams ==
- 1996-97: Macedonia U-18 national basketball team
- 1997-99: Macedonia national basketball team(assistant)
- 1999-00: Macedonia U-20 national basketball team
- 2000-01: Macedonia national basketball team
- 2010-12: Macedonia national basketball team

== Championships and cups as head coach ==
=== European club continental championships ===
- 2003-04: KK Rabotnicki: FIBA Europe Cup South Conference (Finalist)
- 2008-09: KK Rabotnicki: EUROHOLD Balkan League (Finalist)

=== National domestic league championships ===
- 1994-95: KK Rabotnicki: Macedonian League
- 1995-96: KK Rabotnicki: Macedonian League
- 1997-98: KK Rabotnicki: Macedonian League
- 1998-99: KK Rabotnicki: Macedonian League
- 2003-04: KK Rabotnicki: Macedonian League
- 2005-06: PBC Lukoil Academic: Bulgarian League
- 2006-07: PBC Lukoil Academic: Bulgarian League
- 2008-09: KK Rabotnicki: Macedonian League
- 2011-12: PBC Lukoil Academic: Bulgarian League
- 2013-14: Sigal Prishtina: Kosovar League
- 2017-18: KK Rabotnicki: Macedonian League

=== National domestic cup championships ===
- 1997-98: KK Rabotnicki: Macedonian Cup
- 2004-05: KK Rabotnicki: Macedonian Cup
- 2005-06: PBC Lukoil Academic: Bulgarian Cup
- 2006-07: PBC Lukoil Academic: Bulgarian Cup
- 2010-11: KK Rabotnicki: Macedonian Cup
- 2011-12: PBC Lukoil Academic: Bulgarian Cup

== Honours ==
- Macedonian Coach of the Year - 1999 and 2011
- Eurobasket.com All-Bulgarian A1 Co-coach of the Year - 2005
