= KK Pelister =

Basketball club in Bitola, North Macedonia

Active departments of Pelister
FK Pelister (football)	RK Pelister (handball)	RK Pelister 2 (youth handball)

Pelister
- Leagues: Macedonian League
- Founded: 1948
- Arena: Boro Čurlevski Sports Hall
- Capacity: 3,500
- Location: Bitola, North Macedonia
- Team colors: Green and White
- President: Bojan Davkov
- Head coach: Tane Stasev
- Website: https://kkpelister.mk/
Home	Away

KK Pelister is a men's professional basketball club based in Bitola, North Macedonia. They currently play in the Macedonian League and the ABA League Second Division.

== History ==
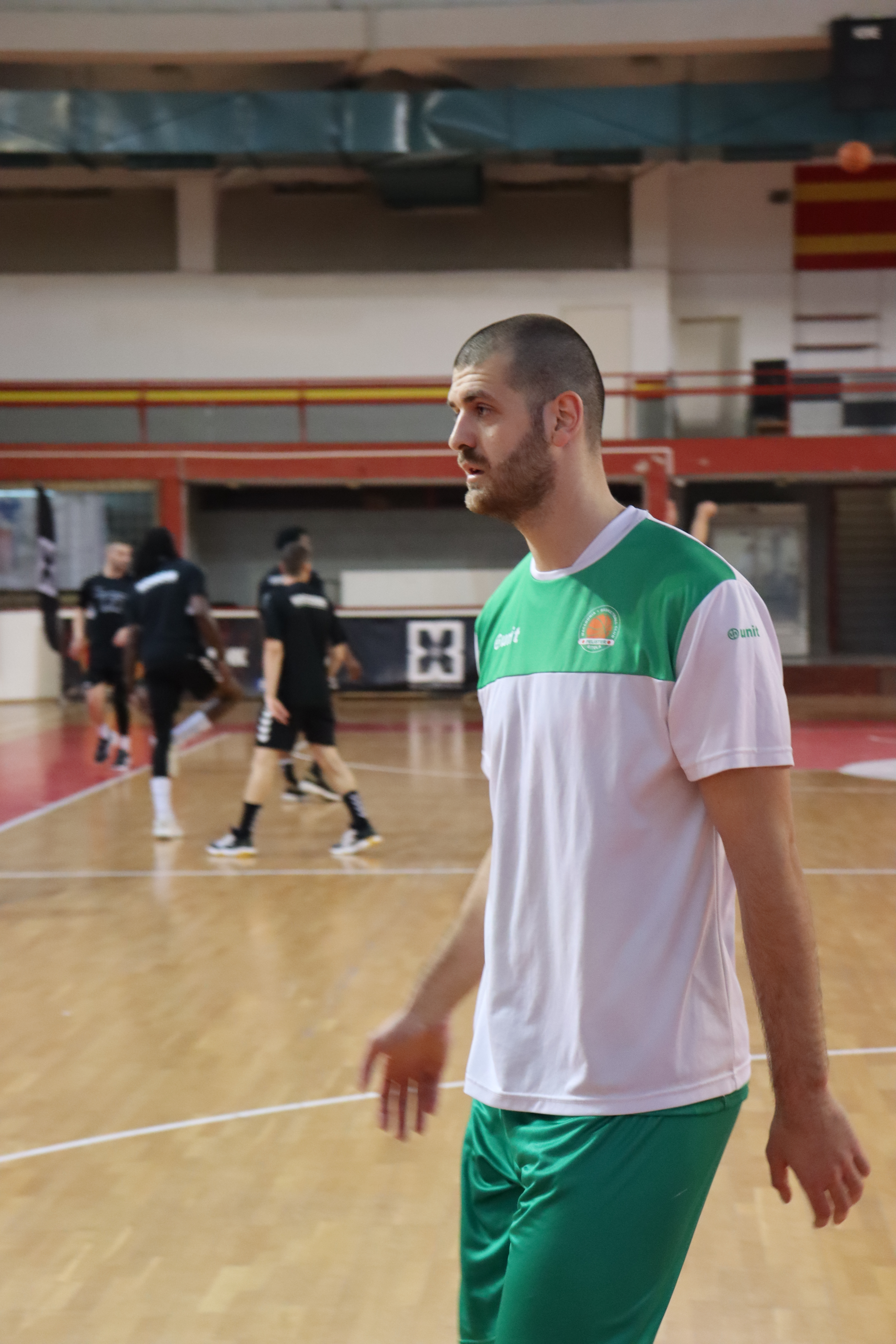
Igor Kesar

The original club was founded in 1948. Pelister was known as Mladost Metalec from 1992 until 1996 and later Pelister (96-06), Swisslion Pelister (06-09), Pelister (09-11), Pelister Sport (11-14), Pelister (14-15), KK Pelister AD Bitola (2015). They have been competing in the top Macedonian league for many years, having won 3 league titles. First one was in 1975, second one in 1989 and the last one back in 1991. Since then they've competed in the play-offs and made the Macedonian Cup Finals, but have not managed to win a new trophy. On 22nd October 2025, they won their first FIBA Europe Cup match by defeating BC Prievidza 90-83.

== Honours ==
Macedonian Champions

1st Winners (3): 1975, 1989 and 1991

=== Macedonian League ===
2nd (3): 2022, 2023 and 2024
3rd (4): 2006, 2007, 2009 and 2026

=== Macedonian Cup ===
Finalist (2): 2009 and 2024

== Arena ==
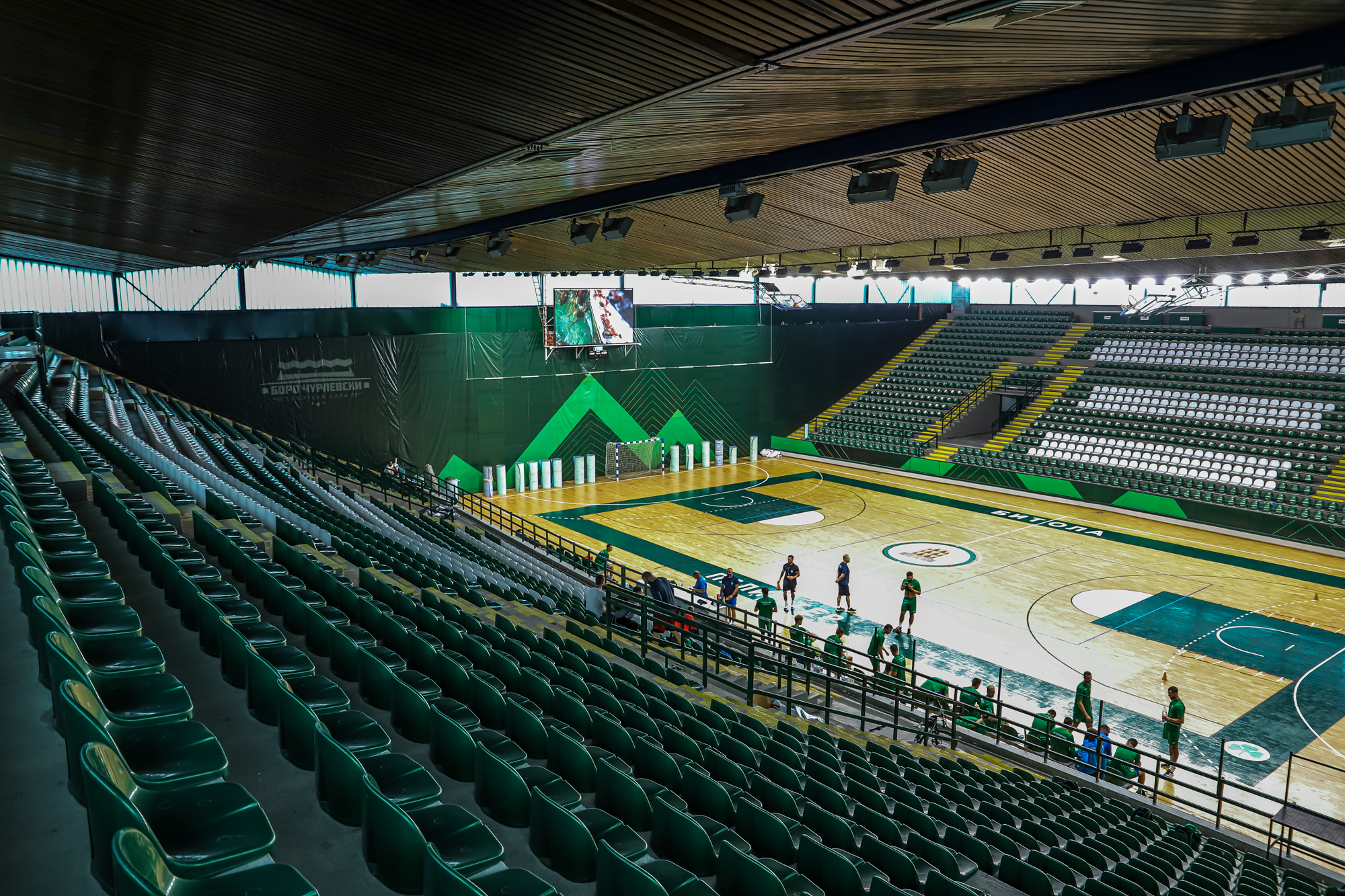
Sports Hall Boro Churlevski - Bitola

KK Pelister play all their home matches at Sports Hall Boro Čurlevski. The arena has a current seating capacity of 3,500. It hosted the 2007 Macedonian Basketball Cup and had the largest seating capacity in Macedonia before the construction of the Boris Trajkovski Sports Center in Skopje.

== Supporters ==
Čkembari (Macedonian: Чкембари) are a supporters' group, established on 25 September 1985, who support the Macedonian sports clubs from Bitola that compete under the Pelister banner, mainly FK Pelister in football and RK Pelister in handball. The group was founded when a caravan of 15 buses traveled to support RK Pelister who was playing against Partizan Bjelovar in a handball relegation play-off match.

== European record ==
Pelister debued in 2025–26 Basketball Champions League against Pallacanestro Reggiana.

- (Italian Basketball Federation) Pallacanestro Reggiana (Basketball Federation of North Macedonia) Pelister 99 - 87

And qualified for the 2025–26 FIBA Europe Cup group stage.

== Current roster ==
Note: Flags indicate national team eligibility at FIBA-sanctioned events. Players may hold other non-FIBA nationalities not displayed.

KK Pelister roster
Players
Coaches

Pos.	No.	Nat.	Name	Ht.		Age
SG	55	(United States)	McDowell, Camron	1.96 m (6 ft 5 in)	86 kg (190 lb)	23 – 31 December 2002
PG	2	(United States)	Wilson, C.J	1.80 m (5 ft 11 in)		32 – 3 September 1994
SF	4	(North Macedonia)	Markovski, Naum	1.88 m (6 ft 2 in)		19 – 3 July 2007
C	44	(United States)	Wheeler, Roosevelt	2.11 m (6 ft 11 in)	108 kg (238 lb)	25 – 1 January 2001
SG	17	(North Macedonia)	Sapundjiev, Ivan	1.91 m (6 ft 3 in)	87 kg (192 lb)	31 – 13 May 1995
PG	9	(North Macedonia)	Zlatevski, Viktor	1.91 m (6 ft 3 in)	82 kg (181 lb)	24 – 19 February 2002
PF	0	(United States) (North Macedonia)	Range, Alozno	1.98 m (6 ft 6 in)	103 kg (227 lb)	28 – 1 November 1998
SF	14	(North Macedonia)	Sozovski, Leo	1.92 m (6 ft 4 in)		18 – 22 January 2008
PG	19	(North Macedonia)	Savicevic, Luka	1.84 m (6 ft 0 in)	88 kg (194 lb)	25 – 21 July 2001
SF	11	(North Macedonia)	Kjirilovski, Kosta	1.98 m (6 ft 6 in)		20 – 31 August 2006
PF	34	(North Macedonia)	Dimitriev, Blagoj	1.98 m (6 ft 6 in)		26 – 23 July 2000
C	24	(North Macedonia)	Dimitriev, Bojan	2.04 m (6 ft 8 in)		20 – 22 January 2006
SF		(Serbia)	Kočović, Nikola	1.97 m (6 ft 6 in)	83 kg (183 lb)	30 – 17 April 1996

Head coach

- (North Macedonia) Tane Spasev

Assistant coach(es)

- (North Macedonia) Dejan Ilievski

Legend

- (C) Team captain
- Injured

=== Depth chart ===
Pos.	Starting 5	Bench 1	Bench 2
C	Roosevelt Wheeler	Bojan Dimitriev
PF	Alozno Range Jr.	Blagoj Dimitriev	Leo Sozovski
SF	Nikola Kočović	Kosta Kjirilovski	Camron McDowell
SG	Luka Savicevic	Ivan Sapundjiev	Naum Markovski
PG	C.J Wilson	Viktor Zlatevski

==== In ====
Date	Position	Player	Moving from
25 July 2026	PF	(North Macedonia) Blagoj Dimitriev	(North Macedonia) Tikveš
27 July 2026	PF	(United States) (North Macedonia) Alozno Range Jr.	(Azerbaijan) Quba BC
29 July 2026	SF	(North Macedonia) Kosta Kjirilovski	(North Macedonia) Kožuv
31 July 2026	SG	(North Macedonia) Ivan Sapundjiev	(North Macedonia) Gostivar
3 August 2026	PG	(North Macedonia) Viktor Zlatevski	(North Macedonia) KK Feniks 2010
6 August 2026	SF	(United States) Camron McDowell	(United States) Tarleton State Texans
7 August 2026	C	(North Macedonia) Bojan Dimitriev	(North Macedonia) BC Vodno Suns Partizan
11 August 2026	SG	(North Macedonia) Luka Savicevic	(North Macedonia) KK Feniks 2010
19 August 2026	PG	(United States) C.J Wilson	(Sweden) Södertälje BBK
1 September 2026	C	(United States) Roosevelt Wheeler	(Chile) Colegio Los Leones de Quilpué
16 October 2026	SF	(Serbia) Nikola Kocovic	(Romania) CSM Oradea

==== Out ====
Date	Position	Player	Moving to
10 June 2026	PG	(North Macedonia) Boban Stajić	(North Macedonia) Kumanovo
19 June 2026	SG	(North Macedonia) Andrej Mitrevski	(United States) Pacific Tigers
8 July 2026	SG	(North Macedonia) Luka Stojanovski	(North Macedonia) MZT Skopje
23 July 2026	SF	(North Macedonia) Damjan Krstevski	(North Macedonia) Kožuv
30 July 2026	PF	(United States) Kevin Bracy-Davis	(Kosovo) Trepça
4 August 2026	C	(United States) Langston Wilson	(Lithuania) Gargždai
TBA	PG	(United States) Branden Jenkins	TBA
TBA	PF	(Serbia) Nikola Malešević	TBA

== Notable players ==
- (North Macedonia) Zoran Petkovski
- (North Macedonia) Gjorgji Anakievski
- (North Macedonia) Gjorgji Talevski
- (North Macedonia) Dimitar Karadžovski
- (North Macedonia) Daniel Zaharievski
- (North Macedonia) Petar Apcev
- (North Macedonia) Damjan Krstevski
- (North Macedonia) Luka Stojanovski
- (North Macedonia) Boban Stajić
- (Serbia) Branko Mirković
- (Serbia) Milan Miljković
- (Serbia) Marko Čakarević
- (Serbia) Aleksandar Kalanj
- (Serbia) Đorđe Jovanović
- (Serbia) Miloš Pejanović
- (Serbia) Boško Jovović
- (Serbia) Aleksandar Held
- (Serbia) Igor Kesar
- (Serbia) Nikola Malešević
- (United States) Keoni Watson
- (United States) Dontay Caruthers
- (United States) C.J. Wilson
- (United States) Austin Price
- (United States) Branden Jenkins
- (United States) Langston Wilson
- (United States) Kevin Bracy-Davis
- (Croatia) Jure Planinić
- (Bosnia and Herzegovina) Sead Hadzifejzović
