= KK Gostivar =

- Leagues: Macedonian First League
- Founded: 1954; 72 years ago
- History: List: 1996–2004 Nikol Fert 2004–2008 Mavrovo 2009–2011 Gostivar 2009 2015–present Gostivar 2015
- Arena: Sports Hall Mladost
- Capacity: 2,500
- Location: Gostivar, North Macedonia
- Team colors: White and blue
- President: Stojmir Dejanoski
- Head coach: Aleksandar Petrović
- Championships: 1 Championships of Macedonia; 2 Macedonian Cup; 2 Macedonian Super Cup
Home	Away

BC Gostivar (Macedonian: КК Гостивар) is a basketball club based in Gostivar, North Macedonia. In the past it was known as Nikol Fert for sponsorship reasons. The team currently competes in the Macedonian First League.

== History ==
The team was established in 1954 under name KK Mavrovo. It changed its name numerous times over the year. KK Goteks, KK Vardar-Komerc, KK Gostivar and KK Nikol-Fert Gostivar. KK Gostivar is three times republic league champion of Macedonia. In the golden age of its existence it won three title in: 1965, 1967 and 1968. They waited for a long time for their fourth title but after 32 years they won their 4th title in 2000. Next year in the season 2000-01 they won their first Macedonian Basketball Cup by beating KK Rabotnički in the final 72–65. Next season they once again defeated Rabotnički 88–82 to claim back to back Cup titles.

== Honours ==
- Macedonian First League

Winner (4): 1964–65, 1966–67, 1967–68, 1999–2000

- Macedonian Cup

Winner (2): 2001, 2002

- Macedonian Super Cup

Winner (2): 2000, 2002

== Players ==
=== Current roster ===
KK Gostivar roster
Players
Coaches

Pos.	No.	Nat.	Name	Ht.		Age
G	7	(North Macedonia)	Serafimoski, Luka	1.89 m (6 ft 2 in)		20 – 18 April 2005
F	14	(North Macedonia)	Dimovski, Lazar	2.07 m (6 ft 9 in)		24 – 14 November 2001
PG	21	(North Macedonia)	Pecanoski, Marko	1.80 m (5 ft 11 in)		22 – 16 April 2003
G/F	--	(North Macedonia)	Dimitrievski, Renato	1.96 m (6 ft 5 in)		34 – 17 October 1991
F	--	(North Macedonia)	Stoleski, Kristijan	2.00 m (6 ft 7 in)		23 – 30 September 2002
PG	--	(North Macedonia)	Mladenović, Marjan	1.80 m (5 ft 11 in)		38 – 27 August 1987
SG	--	(North Macedonia)	Sapundjiev, Ivan	1.97 m (6 ft 6 in)		31 – 13 May 1994
PG	--	(United States)	Myers, Marcus	1.85 m (6 ft 1 in)	73 kg (161 lb)	29 – 7 June 1996
G	--	(United States)	Cook, Christian	1.88 m (6 ft 2 in)	79 kg (174 lb)	24 – 7 October 2001
PF	--	(United States)	Eatmon, Ja'Derryus	2.08 m (6 ft 10 in)	107 kg (236 lb)

Head coach

- (North Macedonia) Ljupčo Malinkov

Assistant coach(es)

- (North Macedonia) Nikola Dimitrievski
- (North Macedonia) Petar Angelov

Legend

- (C) Team captain
- Injured

- Roster
Updated: 2025-09-01

=== Depth chart ===
Pos.	Starting 5	Bench 1	Bench 2
C	Jonathan Komagum
PF	Nenad Zivčević	Vuk Đorđević
SF	Mladen Grušanović	Lazar Dimovski
SG	Darko Sokolov	Maksim Mitevski
PG	Will Ellis	Luka Serafimoski	Marko Pecanoski

== Former players ==
- (North Macedonia) Radislav Jovanoski
- (North Macedonia) Milan Sotirovski
- (North Macedonia) Todor Gečevski
- (North Macedonia) Jordančo Davitkov
- (North Macedonia) Dejan Dimov
- (North Macedonia) Marjan Janevski
- (North Macedonia) Slobodan Petrovski
- (North Macedonia) Vlatko Vladičevski
- (North Macedonia) Vojislav Zivčević
- (North Macedonia) Pero Blazevski
- (North Macedonia) Gjorgji Knjazev
- (North Macedonia) Budimir Jolović
- (North Macedonia) Bojan Trajkovski
- (Croatia) Josip Sičić
- (Serbia and Montenegro) Dušan Sučević
- (Serbia and Montenegro) Dejan Jeftić
- (Soviet Union) (Greece) Michail Misunov
- (North Macedonia) (Albania) Artan Kuqo
- (North Macedonia) (Kosovo) Lejson Zeqiri
- (Kosovo) (United States) Malcolm Armstead

== European competitions ==
They played 4 times in European competition. In the season 1996/97, 1999/00 and 2000/01 they played in FKC/FIBA Korac Cup. In the 2002/03 season they played in FRC/FIBA-Europe Regional Challenge.

Scores of KK Nikolfert Gostivar in Europe:

1996 Radivoj Korać Cup

Round	Team	Home	Away
Qualif.Round	(Hungary) Debreceni	74–43	70–56
Group stage	(Belgium) Pepinster	90–83	80–65
Group stage	(Croatia) Telecomp Vinkovci	83–75	66–48
Group stage	(Spain) Saski Baskonia	72–74	118–73

1999 Radivoj Korać Cup

Round	Team	Home	Away
Qualif.Round	(Slovenia) Zagorje	82–87	80–97
Group stage	(Israel) Maccabi Haifa	86–92	72–45
Group stage	(Italy) Pallacanestro Reggiana	75–71	96–71
Group stage	(Serbia) Beopetrol	Quit	Quit

1999 Radivoj Korać Cup

Round	Team	Home	Away
Qualif.Round	(Bosnia and Herzegovina) Sloboda Tuzla	66–61	81–60

2002 Europe Champions Cup

Round	Team	Home	Away
Qualif.Round	(Bosnia and Herzegovina) HKK Brotnjo	64–78	59–76
Group stage	(Croatia) Zrinjevac	87–79	89–92
Group stage	(Cyprus) AEL Limassol	67–87	75–84
