= KK Vardar =

- Nickname: Црвено-црниот (The Red-Blacks)
- Leagues: Macedonian First League
- Founded: 20 July 1947; 79 years ago
- History: Vardar (1947–2001); Vardar Imperijal (2001–2003); Vardar 2000 (2003–2004); Vardar Osiguruvanje (2004–2008); Vardar 2000 (2008–2010); Vardar (2010–present)
- Arena: SRC Kale
- Capacity: 2,500
- Location: Skopje, North Macedonia
- Team colors: Red, black
- President: Branko Andrievski
- Head coach: Aleksandar Jovančev
- Championships: 5 Macedonian National Leagues; 1 Macedonian Cup
- Website: kkvardar.mk
Home	Away

KK Vardar (Macedonian: КК Вардар) is a basketball club based in Skopje, North Macedonia. Established in 1947, the team has won the Macedonian National League five times and the Macedonian Cup once.

== History ==
On 20 July 1947, MSD Makedonija and ŽSD Pobeda merged into the newly-established Vardar Sports Association, forming a new club named KK Vardar. In the Yugoslav period between 1947 and 1991, Vardar won five Macedonian National League titles (1947, 1953, 1969, 1981, and 1990). During the 2000s, they were runners-up of the Macedonian First League twice, and also lost in the semifinals on three occasions. They won their first Macedonian Cup in 2007, beating KK Strumica 73–66 in the final.

== Arena ==
KK Vardar plays its home matches at SRC Kale, a multi-purpose indoor sports arena in Skopje. Kale means "Fortress Citadel", named after the Skopje Fortress, located right next to the arena. The hall was built in 1970 and its total seating capacity is 2,500.

The hall is mainly used for handball, although it is suitable for events in others sports and music concerts.

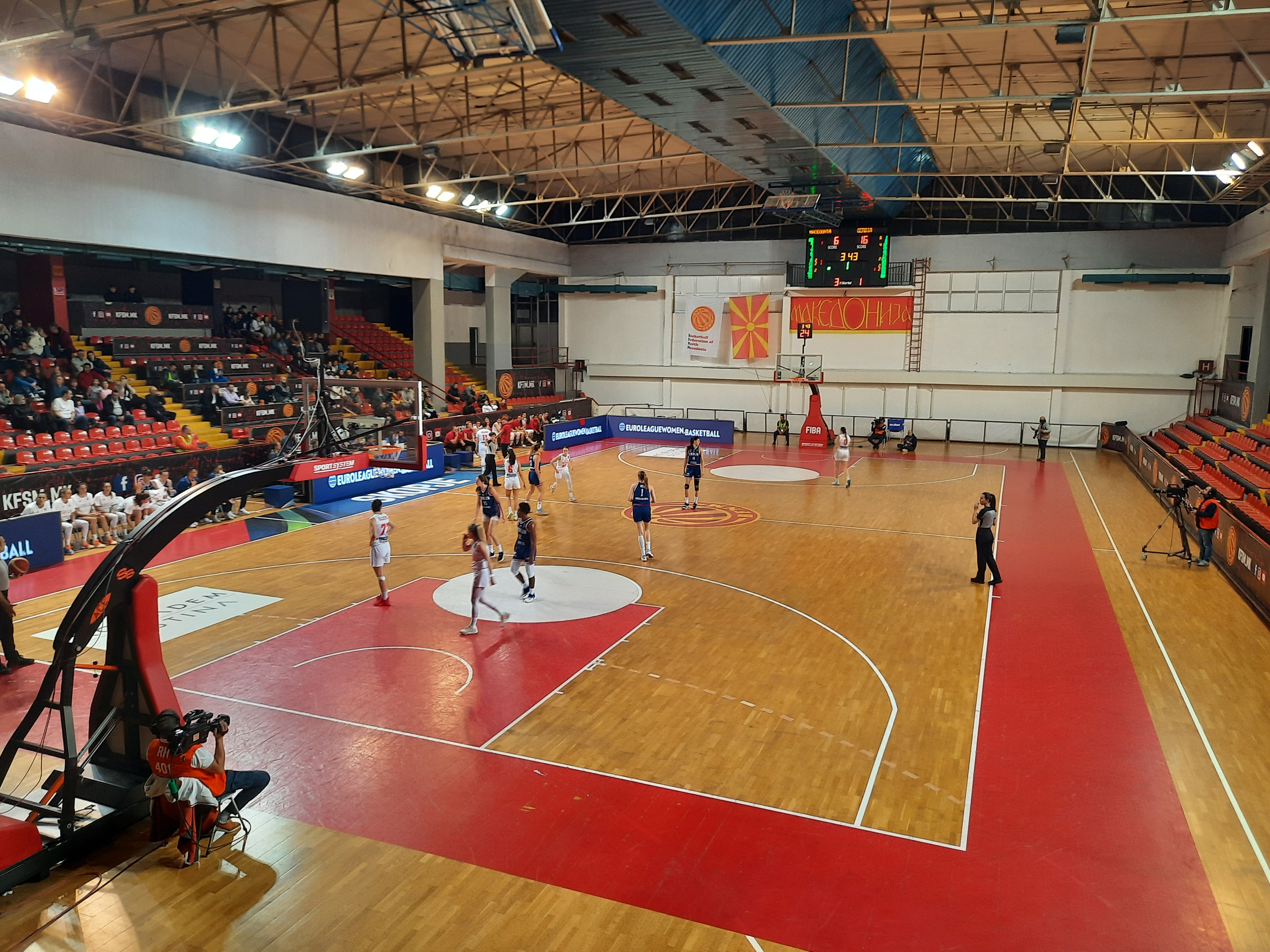
SRC Kale

== Honours ==
- Macedonian National League (until 1992)

Winners: 1947, 1953, 1969, 1980–81, 1989–90

- Macedonian First League (since 1992)

Runners-up: 2004–05, 2005–06
Semifinals: 2002–03, 2003–04, 2006–07

- Macedonian Second League

Winners: 2010–11, 2017–18
Runners-up: 1999–2000, 2015–16

- Macedonian Cup

Winners: 2007
Runners-up: 2005, 2006

== Players ==
=== Current roster ===
Note: Flags indicate national team eligibility at FIBA-sanctioned events. Players may hold other non-FIBA nationalities not displayed.

KK Vardar roster
Players
Coaches

Pos.	No.	Nat.	Name	Ht.	Age
		(North Macedonia)	Minovski, Milorad		38 – 8 August 1988
		(North Macedonia)	Ivanovikj, Igor		32 – 15 November 1993
		(North Macedonia)	Mitrevski, Matej		19 – 23 April 2007
		(North Macedonia)	Mirkovski, Bogdan		23 – 9 October 2002
		(North Macedonia)	Atanasov, Andreja		28 – 18 November 1997
		(North Macedonia)	Mitkov, Blazho		29 – 27 June 1997
		(North Macedonia)	Bajram, Husein		24 – 19 January 2002
		(North Macedonia)	Arsovski, Nikola		22 – 17 May 2004
		(North Macedonia)	Marjanovikj, Luka		18 – 17 October 2007
		(North Macedonia)	Mladenovski, Sergej		20 – 18 July 2006
		(North Macedonia)	Stojanov, Angel		21 – 23 June 2005
		(North Macedonia)	Trajkovski, Darijan		19 – 3 December 2006
		(North Macedonia)	Lukanoski, Marko		20 – 6 March 2006
		(North Macedonia)	Najkov, Ilin		19 – 9 May 2007
		(North Macedonia)	Nakov, Filip		22 – 9 September 2003
		(Turkey)	Sarıoğlu, Emir Acar		21 – 23 June 2005

Head coach

- (North Macedonia) Aleksandar Jovančev

Assistant coach(es)

- (North Macedonia) Zlatko Mokrov

Physiotherapist(s)

- (North Macedonia) Brankica Perchinkovska

Team manager

- (North Macedonia) Branko Andrievski

Legend

- (C) Team captain
- Injured

- Roster
Updated: 29 September 2023

=== Notable former players ===
Note: Flags indicate national team eligibility at FIBA-sanctioned events. Players may hold other non-FIBA nationalities not displayed.

Criteria

To appear in this section a player must have either:

- Set a club record or won an individual award while at the club
- Played at least one official international match for their national team at any time
- Played at least one official NBA match at any time.

- (North Macedonia) Goran Samardziev
- (North Macedonia) Goran Dimitrijević
- (North Macedonia) Ivica Dimčevski
- (North Macedonia) Dimitar Mirakovski
- (North Macedonia) Zlatko Gocevski
- (North Macedonia) Darko Radulović
- (North Macedonia) Marjan Gjurov
- (North Macedonia) Darko Zdravkovski
- (North Macedonia) Kiril Pavlovski
- (North Macedonia) Filip Kralevski
- (North Macedonia) Bojan Krstevski
- (North Macedonia) Gjorgji Kočov
- (North Macedonia) Aleksandar Kostoski
- (North Macedonia) Enes Hadžibulić
- (North Macedonia) Aleksandar Sovkovski
- (North Macedonia) Miroslav Despotović
- (North Macedonia) Valmir Kakruki

== See also ==
- WBC Vardar
- FK Vardar (football)
- RK Vardar (handball)
