= FIBA EuroBasket 2009 squads =

The following is the list of squads for each of the 16 teams competing in the FIBA EuroBasket 2009, held in Poland between 7 and 20 September 2009. Each team selected a squad of 12 players for the tournament.

== Group A ==
=== Greece ===
Coach: (Lithuania) Jonas Kazlauskas

| No | Player | Height (m) | Height (f) | Position | Year born | Current Club |
|---|---|---|---|---|---|---|
| 4 | Giannis Kalambokis | 1.96 | 6' 05″ | Guard | 1978 | (Greece) Panionios |
| 5 | Ioannis Bourousis | 2.15 | 7' 01″ | Center | 1983 | (Greece) Olympiacos |
| 6 | Nikos Zisis | 1.97 | 6' 06″ | Guard | 1983 | (Italy) Montepaschi Siena |
| 7 | Vassilis Spanoulis | 1.93 | 6' 04″ | Guard | 1982 | (Greece) Panathinaikos |
| 8 | Nick Calathes | 1.98 | 6' 06″ | Guard | 1989 | (Greece) Panathinaikos |
| 9 | Antonis Fotsis | 2.09 | 6' 10″ | Forward | 1981 | (Greece) Panathinaikos |
| 10 | Georgios Printezis | 2.06 | 6' 09″ | Forward | 1985 | (Spain) Unicaja Málaga |
| 11 | Andreas Glyniadakis | 2.16 | 7' 01″ | Center | 1981 | (Greece) Olympiacos |
| 12 | Kostas Kaimakoglou | 2.05 | 6' 09″ | Forward | 1983 | (Greece) Panathinaikos |
| 13 | Kosta Koufos | 2.13 | 7' 00″ | Center | 1989 | (United States) Utah Jazz |
| 14 | Stratos Perperoglou | 2.03 | 6' 08″ | Forward | 1984 | (Greece) Panathinaikos |
| 15 | Sofoklis Schortsanitis | 2.08 | 6' 10″ | Center | 1985 | (Greece) Olympiacos |

=== Croatia ===
Coach: Jasmin Repeša

| No | Player | Height (m) | Height (f) | Position | Year born | Current Club |
|---|---|---|---|---|---|---|
| 4 | Roko Ukić | 1.96 | 6' 05" | Guard | 1984 | (United States) Milwaukee Bucks |
| 5 | Davor Kus | 1.92 | 6' 04" | Guard | 1978 | (Italy) Benetton Treviso |
| 6 | Marko Popović | 1.85 | 6' 01" | Guard | 1982 | (Russia) UNICS Kazan |
| 7 | Nikola Vujčić | 2.11 | 6' 11" | Center | 1978 | (Greece) Olympiacos |
| 8 | Nikola Prkačin | 2.08 | 6' 10" | Forward | 1975 | (Croatia) Cibona Zagreb |
| 9 | Marin Rozić | 2.03 | 6' 08" | Forward | 1983 | (Croatia) Cibona Zagreb |
| 10 | Zoran Planinić | 2.01 | 6' 07" | Guard | 1982 | (Russia) CSKA Moscow |
| 11 | Mario Stojić | 1.98 | 6' 06" | Guard | 1980 | (Spain) ViveMenorca |
| 12 | Krešimir Lončar | 2.10 | 6' 11" | Center | 1983 | (Russia) UNICS Kazan |
| 13 | Marko Banić | 2.06 | 6' 09" | Forward | 1984 | (Spain) Bilbao Basket |
| 14 | Sandro Nicević | 2.11 | 6' 11" | Center | 1976 | (Italy) Benetton Treviso |
| 15 | Mario Kasun | 2.16 | 7' 01" | Center | 1980 | (Turkey) Efes Pilsen |

=== North Macedonia ===
Coach: (Serbia) Jovica Arsić

| No | Player | Height (m) | Height (f) | Position | Year born | Current Club |
|---|---|---|---|---|---|---|
| 4 | Vrbica Stefanov | 1.88 | 6' 02" | Guard | 1973 | (Spain) ViveMenorca |
| 5 | Dimitar Mirakovski | 1.85 | 6' 01" | Guard | 1981 | (Greece) Rethymno Cretan |
| 6 | Darko Sokolov | 1.90 | 6' 03" | Guard | 1986 | (North Macedonia) KK MZT Skopje |
| 7 | Riste Stefanov | 1.99 | 6' 06" | Guard | 1983 | (Bulgaria) Lukoil Academic |
| 8 | Vojdan Stojanovski | 1.93 | 6' 04" | Guard | 1987 | (North Macedonia) KK AMAK SP |
| 9 | Pero Blaževski | 1.96 | 6' 05" | Forward | 1972 | (North Macedonia) MZT Skopje |
| 10 | Dime Tasovski | 2.01 | 6' 07" | Forward | 1980 | (North Macedonia) KK Rabotnički |
| 11 | Todor Gečevski | 2.10 | 6' 11" | Center | 1977 | (Croatia) KK Zadar |
| 12 | Pero Antić | 2.09 | 6' 10" | Forward | 1982 | (Russia) Lokomotiv Rostov |
| 13 | Damjan Stojanovski | 1.93 | 6' 04" | Forward | 1987 | (North Macedonia) AMAK SP |
| 14 | Jeremiah Massey | 2.02 | 6' 08" | Forward | 1982 | (Spain) Real Madrid |
| 15 | Predrag Samardžiski | 2.16 | 7' 01" | Center | 1986 | (Serbia) FMP Železnik |

=== Israel ===
Coach: Zvi Sherf

| No | Player | Height (m) | Height (f) | Position | Year born | Current Club |
|---|---|---|---|---|---|---|
| 4 | Moran Rot | 1.83 | 6' 00" | Guard | 1982 | (Israel) Hapoel Jerusalem |
| 5 | Yuval Naimi | 1.87 | 6' 02" | Guard | 1988 | (Israel) Hapoel Jerusalem |
| 6 | Gal Mekel | 1.95 | 6' 05" | Guard | 1988 | (Israel) Maccabi Tel Aviv |
| 7 | Raviv Limonad | 1.91 | 6' 03" | Guard | 1984 | (Israel) Maccabi Tel Aviv |
| 8 | Guy Pnini | 2.01 | 6' 07" | Forward | 1983 | (Israel) Maccabi Tel Aviv |
| 9 | Yotam Halperin | 1.96 | 6' 05" | Guard | 1984 | (Greece) Olympiacos |
| 10 | Tal Burstein | 1.98 | 6' 06" | Guard | 1980 | (Israel) Maccabi Tel Aviv |
| 11 | Lior Eliyahu | 2.07 | 6' 09" | Forward | 1985 | (Spain) Caja Laboral |
| 12 | Moshe Mizrahi | 2.02 | 6' 08" | Forward | 1980 | (Israel) Maccabi Haifa |
| 13 | Ido Kozikaro | 2.02 | 6' 08" | Forward | 1978 | (Israel) Maccabi Haifa |
| 14 | Yaniv Green | 2.06 | 6' 09" | Center | 1980 | (Israel) Maccabi Tel Aviv |
| 15 | Amit Tamir | 2.09 | 6' 10" | Center | 1979 | (Israel) Ironi Ashkelon |

== Group B ==
=== Russia ===
Coach: (United States) David Blatt

| No | Player | Height (m) | Height (f) | Position | Year born | Current Club |
|---|---|---|---|---|---|---|
| 4 | Andrey Vorontsevich | 2.07 | 6' 09" | Forward | 1987 | (Russia) CSKA Moscow |
| 5 | Nikita Kurbanov | 2.03 | 6' 08" | Forward | 1986 | (Russia) CSKA Moscow |
| 6 | Sergey Bykov | 1.90 | 6' 03" | Guard | 1983 | (Russia) Lokomotiv Kuban |
| 7 | Vitaly Fridzon | 1.95 | 6' 05" | Guard | 1985 | (Russia) Khimki |
| 8 | Kelly McCarty | 2.01 | 6' 07" | Forward | 1975 | (Russia) UNICS Kazan |
| 9 | Dmitri Sokolov | 2.14 | 7' 00" | Center | 1985 | (Russia) CSKA Moscow |
| 10 | Fedor Dmitriev | 2.05 | 6' 09" | Forward | 1984 | (Russia) Spartak Saint Petersburg |
| 11 | Egor Vyaltsev | 1.94 | 6' 04" | Guard | 1985 | (Russia) Khimki |
| 12 | Sergey Monya | 2.05 | 6' 09" | Forward | 1983 | (Russia) Khimki |
| 13 | Anton Ponkrashov | 2.00 | 6' 07" | Guard | 1986 | (Russia) CSKA Moscow |
| 14 | Alexey Zozulin | 2.01 | 6' 07" | Guard | 1983 | (Russia) CSKA Moscow |
| 15 | Timofey Mozgov | 2.16 | 7' 01" | Center | 1986 | (United States) Denver Nuggets |

=== Germany ===
Coach: Dirk Bauermann

| No | Player | Height (m) | Height (f) | Position | Year born | Current Club |
|---|---|---|---|---|---|---|
| 4 | Lucca Staiger | 1.96 | 6' 05" | Guard | 1988 | (United States) Iowa State University |
| 5 | Heiko Schaffartzik | 1.85 | 6' 01" | Guard | 1984 | (Germany) New Yorker Phantoms |
| 6 | Sven Schultze | 2.08 | 6' 10" | Forward | 1978 | Free Agent |
| 7 | Tim Ohlbrecht | 2.11 | 6' 11" | Center | 1988 | (Germany) Telekom Baskets Bonn |
| 8 | Konrad Wysocki | 2.04 | 6' 08" | Forward | 1982 | (Poland) Turów Zgorzelec |
| 9 | Steffen Hamann | 1.95 | 6' 05" | Guard | 1981 | (Germany) ALBA Berlin |
| 10 | Demond Greene | 1.86 | 6' 01" | Guard | 1979 | Free Agent |
| 11 | Tibor Pleiss | 2.15 | 7' 01" | Center | 1989 | (Germany) Brose Baskets |
| 12 | Elias Harris | 2.01 | 6' 07" | Forward | 1989 | (United States) Gonzaga University |
| 13 | Patrick Femerling | 2.15 | 7' 01" | Center | 1975 | Free Agent |
| 14 | Robin Benzing | 2.11 | 6' 11" | Forward | 1989 | (Germany) Ratiopharm Ulm |
| 15 | Jan-Hendrik Jagla | 2.13 | 7' 00" | Center | 1981 | Free Agent |

=== Latvia ===
Coach: (Lithuania) Kęstutis Kemzūra

| No | Player | Height (m) | Height (f) | Position | Year born | Last club |
|---|---|---|---|---|---|---|
| 4 | Uvis Helmanis | 2.04 | 6' 08" | Forward | 1972 | (Latvia) ASK Rīga |
| 5 | Aigars Vitols | 1.94 | 6' 04" | Guard | 1976 | (Latvia) ASK Rīga |
| 6 | Armands Šķēle | 1.94 | 6' 04" | Guard | 1983 | (Latvia) Barons LMT |
| 7 | Jānis Blūms | 1.91 | 6' 03" | Guard | 1982 | (Spain) Bilbao Basket |
| 8 | Ernests Kalve | 2.03 | 6' 08" | Forward | 1987 | (Latvia) ASK Rīga |
| 9 | Kristaps Valters | 1.88 | 6' 02" | Guard | 1981 | (Spain) Fuenlabrada |
| 10 | Gatis Jahovičs | 2.00 | 6' 07" | Forward | 1984 | (Latvia) BK VEF Rīga |
| 11 | Kaspars Kambala | 2.06 | 6' 09" | Center | 1978 | (Russia) Enisey Krasnoyarsk |
| 12 | Rolands Freimanis | 2.07 | 6' 09" | Forward | 1988 | (Latvia) BK VEF Rīga |
| 13 | Artūrs Štālbergs | 1.96 | 6' 05" | Forward | 1984 | (Latvia) Liepājas Lauvas |
| 14 | Kristaps Janičenoks | 1.96 | 6' 05" | Forward | 1983 | (Italy) Reyer Venezia |
| 15 | Andris Biedriņš | 2.11 | 6' 11" | Center | 1986 | (United States) Golden State Warriors |

=== France ===
Coach: (France) Vincent Collet

| No | Player | Height (m) | Height (f) | Position | Year born | Current Club |
|---|---|---|---|---|---|---|
| 4 | Antoine Diot | 1.93 | 6' 04" | Guard | 1989 | (France) Le Mans |
| 5 | Nicolas Batum | 2.03 | 6' 08" | Forward | 1988 | (United States) Portland Trail Blazers |
| 6 | Aymeric Jeanneau | 1.85 | 6' 01" | Guard | 1978 | (France) ASVEL Villeurbanne |
| 7 | Alain Koffi | 2.07 | 6' 09" | Forward | 1980 | (Spain) Joventut Badalona |
| 8 | Ian Mahinmi | 2.11 | 6' 11" | Center | 1986 | (United States) Indiana Pacers |
| 9 | Tony Parker | 1.88 | 6' 02" | Guard | 1982 | (United States) San Antonio Spurs |
| 10 | Yannick Bokolo | 1.91 | 6' 03" | Guard | 1985 | (France) Gravelines Dunkerque |
| 11 | Florent Piétrus | 2.02 | 6' 08" | Forward | 1981 | (Spain) Valencia BC |
| 12 | Nando de Colo | 1.96 | 6' 05" | Guard | 1987 | (United States) San Antonio Spurs |
| 13 | Boris Diaw | 2.03 | 6' 08" | Forward | 1982 | (United States) San Antonio Spurs |
| 14 | Ronny Turiaf | 2.08 | 6' 10" | Center | 1983 | (United States) Los Angeles Clippers |
| 15 | Ali Traore | 2.08 | 6' 10" | Center | 1985 | (Russia) Lokomotiv Kuban |

== Group C ==
=== Spain ===
Coach: (Italy) Sergio Scariolo

| No | Player | Height | Height | Position | Year born | Current Club |
|---|---|---|---|---|---|---|
| 4 | Pau Gasol | 2.15 | 7–1 | Center | 1980 | (United States) Los Angeles Lakers |
| 5 | Rudy Fernández | 1.98 | 6–6 | Guard | 1985 | (United States) Portland Trail Blazers |
| 6 | Ricky Rubio | 1.96 | 6–5 | Guard | 1990 | (Spain) FC Barcelona |
| 7 | Juan Carlos Navarro | 1.92 | 6–4 | Guard | 1980 | (Spain) FC Barcelona |
| 8 | Víctor Claver | 2.07 | 6–9 | Forward | 1988 | (Spain) Valencia BC |
| 9 | Felipe Reyes | 2.06 | 6–9 | Center | 1980 | (Spain) Real Madrid |
| 10 | Carlos Cabezas | 1.87 | 6–2 | Guard | 1980 | (Russia) Khimki |
| 11 | Raúl López | 1.86 | 6–1 | Guard | 1980 | (Russia) Khimki |
| 12 | Sergio Llull | 1.90 | 6–3 | Guard | 1987 | (Spain) Real Madrid |
| 13 | Marc Gasol | 2.16 | 7–1 | Center | 1985 | (United States) Memphis Grizzlies |
| 14 | Álex Mumbrú | 2.02 | 6–8 | Forward | 1979 | (Spain) Bilbao Basket |
| 15 | Jorge Garbajosa | 2.07 | 6–9 | Forward | 1977 | (Spain) Real Madrid |

=== Slovenia ===
Coach: Jure Zdovc

| No | Player | Height | Height | Position | Year born | Current Club |
|---|---|---|---|---|---|---|
| 4 | Uroš Slokar | 2.10 | 6–11 | Center | 1983 | (Italy) GMAC Bologna |
| 5 | Jaka Lakovič | 1.86 | 6–1 | Guard | 1978 | (Spain) FC Barcelona |
| 6 | Domen Lorbek | 1.99 | 6–6 | Guard | 1985 | (Italy) Benetton Treviso |
| 7 | Primož Brezec | 2.16 | 7–1 | Center | 1979 | (United States) Philadelphia 76ers |
| 8 | Matjaž Smodiš | 2.05 | 6–9 | Forward | 1979 | (Russia) CSKA Moscow |
| 9 | Jaka Klobučar | 1.98 | 6–6 | Guard | 1987 | (Slovenia) Union Olimpija |
| 10 | Boštjan Nachbar | 2.07 | 6–9 | Forward | 1980 | (Turkey) Efes Pilsen |
| 11 | Goran Dragić | 1.94 | 6–4 | Guard | 1986 | (United States) Phoenix Suns |
| 12 | Goran Jagodnik | 2.03 | 6–8 | Forward | 1974 | (Czech Republic) Nymburk |
| 13 | Samo Udrih | 1.95 | 6–5 | Guard | 1979 | (Spain) Estudiantes |
| 14 | Jurica Golemac | 2.09 | 6–10 | Forward | 1977 | (Italy) Lottomatica Roma |
| 15 | Erazem Lorbek | 2.10 | 6–11 | Center | 1984 | (Spain) FC Barcelona |

=== Serbia ===
Coach: Dušan Ivković

| No | Player | Height | Height | Position | Year born | Current Club |
|---|---|---|---|---|---|---|
| 4 | Bojan Popović | 1.91 | 6–3 | Guard | 1983 | (Lithuania) Lietuvos Rytas |
| 5 | Milenko Tepić | 2.02 | 6–8 | Forward | 1987 | (Greece) Panathinaikos |
| 6 | Miloš Teodosić | 1.96 | 6–5 | Guard | 1987 | (Greece) Olympiacos |
| 7 | Ivan Paunić | 1.95 | 6–5 | Guard | 1987 | (Belgium) Oostende |
| 8 | Nemanja Bjelica | 2.09 | 6–10 | Forward | 1988 | (Serbia) Crvena Zvezda |
| 9 | Stefan Marković | 1.99 | 6–6 | Guard | 1988 | (Serbia) Hemofarm |
| 10 | Uroš Tripković | 1.98 | 6–6 | Guard | 1986 | (Spain) DKV Joventut |
| 11 | Predrag Joveljić | 2.20 | 7–0 | Center | 1987 | (Serbia) Crvena Zvezda |
| 12 | Nenad Krstić | 2.13 | 7–0 | Center | 1983 | (United States) Oklahoma City Thunder |
| 13 | Kosta Perović | 2.18 | 7–2 | Center | 1986 | (Spain) Valencia BC |
| 14 | Novica Veličković | 2.05 | 6–9 | Forward | 1986 | (Spain) Real Madrid |
| 15 | Milan Mačvan | 2.06 | 6–9 | Forward | 1989 | (Serbia) Hemofarm |

=== Great Britain ===
Coach: (United States) Chris Finch

| No | Player | Height | Height | Position | Year born | Current Club |
|---|---|---|---|---|---|---|
| 4 | Jarrett Hart | 1.95 | 6–5 | Guard | 1980 | (Cyprus) Keravnos |
| 5 | Kieron Achara | 2.08 | 6–10 | Forward | 1983 | (Italy) Angelico Biella |
| 6 | Mike Lenzly | 1.90 | 6–3 | Guard | 1981 | (Italy) Harem Scafati |
| 7 | Pops Mensah-Bonsu | 2.06 | 6–9 | Forward | 1983 | (United States) Houston Rockets |
| 8 | Andrew Sullivan | 2.03 | 6–8 | Forward | 1980 | (Russia) CSK VVS Samara |
| 9 | Nick George | 1.98 | 6–6 | Forward | 1982 | (France) Gravelines Dunkerque |
| 10 | Robert Archibald | 2.11 | 6–11 | Center | 1980 | (Spain) Unicaja Málaga |
| 11 | Joel Freeland | 2.11 | 6–11 | Forward | 1987 | (Spain) Unicaja Málaga |
| 12 | Nate Reinking | 1.83 | 6–0 | Guard | 1973 | (Belgium) Dexia Mons-Hainaut |
| 13 | Daniel Clark | 2.10 | 6–10 | Center | 1988 | (Spain) Estudiantes |
| 14 | Flinder Boyd | 1.82 | 5–11 | Guard | 1980 | (Spain) Beirasar Rosalía |
| 15 | Andrew Betts | 2.17 | 7–1 | Center | 1977 | (Greece) Aris Thessaloniki |

== Group D ==
=== Lithuania ===
Coach: Ramūnas Butautas

| No | Player | Height | Height | Position | Year born | Current Club |
|---|---|---|---|---|---|---|
| 4 | Andrius Mažutis | 1.80 | 5–11 | Guard | 1981 | (Latvia) ASK Riga |
| 5 | Mantas Kalnietis | 1.96 | 6–5 | Guard | 1986 | (Lithuania) Žalgiris Kaunas |
| 6 | Jonas Mačiulis | 2.00 | 6–7 | Guard | 1985 | (Italy) Armani Jeans Milano |
| 7 | Darjuš Lavrinovič | 2.12 | 6–11 | Center | 1979 | (Spain) Real Madrid |
| 8 | Mindaugas Lukauskis | 1.98 | 6–6 | Guard | 1979 | (France) ASVEL Villeurbanne |
| 9 | Tomas Delininkaitis | 1.90 | 6–3 | Guard | 1982 | (Spain) CB Murcia |
| 10 | Artūras Jomantas | 2.00 | 6–7 | Forward | 1985 | (Lithuania) Lietuvos Rytas |
| 11 | Linas Kleiza | 2.03 | 6–8 | Forward | 1985 | (Greece) Olympiacos |
| 12 | Kšyštof Lavrinovič | 2.10 | 6–11 | Forward | 1979 | (Italy) Montepaschi Siena |
| 13 | Simas Jasaitis | 2.03 | 6–8 | Forward | 1982 | (Turkey) Galatasaray |
| 14 | Marijonas Petravičius | 2.09 | 6–10 | Center | 1979 | (Italy) Armani Jeans Milano |
| 15 | Robertas Javtokas | 2.11 | 6–11 | Center | 1980 | (Russia) Khimki |

=== Turkey ===
Coach: (Montenegro) Bogdan Tanjević

| No | Player | Height | Height | Position | Year born | Current Club |
|---|---|---|---|---|---|---|
| 4 | Bekir Yarangüme | 2.01 | 6–7 | Forward | 1977 | (Turkey) Türk Telekom |
| 5 | Sinan Güler | 1.95 | 6–5 | Guard | 1983 | (Turkey) Efes Pilsen |
| 6 | Engin Atsür | 1.93 | 6–4 | Guard | 1984 | (Turkey) Beşiktaş |
| 7 | Ömer Onan | 1.94 | 6–4 | Guard | 1978 | (Turkey) Fenerbahçe |
| 8 | Ersan İlyasova | 2.08 | 6–10 | Forward | 1987 | (United States) Milwaukee Bucks |
| 9 | Barış Hersek | 2.07 | 6–9 | Forward | 1988 | (Turkey) Darüşşafaka |
| 10 | Kerem Tunçeri | 1.91 | 6–3 | Guard | 1979 | (Turkey) Efes Pilsen |
| 11 | Oğuz Savaş | 2.11 | 7–0 | Center | 1987 | (Turkey) Fenerbahçe |
| 12 | Semih Erden | 2.11 | 7–0 | Center | 1986 | (Turkey) Fenerbahçe |
| 13 | Ender Arslan | 1.90 | 6–3 | Guard | 1983 | (Turkey) Efes Pilsen |
| 14 | Ömer Aşık | 2.13 | 7–0 | Center | 1986 | (Turkey) Fenerbahçe |
| 15 | Hidayet Türkoğlu | 2.08 | 6–10 | Forward | 1979 | (Canada) Toronto Raptors |

=== Poland ===
Coach: (Israel) Muli Katzurin

| No | Player | Height | Height | Position | Year born | Current Club |
|---|---|---|---|---|---|---|
| 4 | Maciej Lampe | 2.11 | 6–11 | Forward | 1985 | (Israel) Maccabi Tel Aviv |
| 5 | Krzysztof Roszyk | 2.00 | 6–7 | Forward | 1978 | (Poland) Turów Zgorzelec |
| 6 | Michał Chyliński | 1.96 | 6–5 | Guard | 1986 | (Spain) Clinicas Rincon Axarquia |
| 7 | Krzysztof Szubarga | 1.84 | 6–0 | Guard | 1984 | (Poland) Ostrów Wielkopolski |
| 8 | Robert Skibniewski | 1.83 | 6–0 | Guard | 1983 | (Italy) Seven 2007 Roseto |
| 9 | Szymon Szewczyk | 2.09 | 6–10 | Center | 1982 | (Italy) Air Avellino |
| 10 | Adam Wójcik | 2.09 | 6–10 | Forward | 1970 | (Poland) KK Poznań |
| 11 | Michał Ignerski | 2.05 | 6–9 | Forward | 1982 | (Spain) Lagun Aro GBC |
| 12 | David Logan | 1.85 | 6–1 | Guard | 1982 | (Poland) Asseco Prokom |
| 13 | Marcin Gortat | 2.11 | 6–11 | Center | 1984 | (United States) Orlando Magic |
| 14 | Robert Witka | 2.05 | 6–9 | Forward | 1981 | (Poland) Turów Zgorzelec |
| 15 | Łukasz Koszarek | 1.87 | 6–2 | Guard | 1983 | (Poland) Anwil Włocławek |

=== Bulgaria ===
Coach: (Israel) Pini Gershon

| No | Player | Height | Height | Position | Year born | Current Club |
|---|---|---|---|---|---|---|
| 4 | Deyan Ivanov | 2.06 | 6–9 | Forward | 1986 | (Italy) Sigma Coatings Montegranaro |
| 5 | Kaloyan Ivanov | 2.06 | 6–9 | Forward | 1986 | (Spain) ViveMenorca |
| 6 | Chavdar Kostov | 1.98 | 6–6 | Guard | 1988 | (Bulgaria) Lukoil Academic |
| 7 | Earl Rowland | 1.91 | 6–3 | Guard | 1983 | (Germany) Telekom Baskets Bonn |
| 8 | Filip Videnov | 1.96 | 6–5 | Guard | 1980 | (Spain) CB Granada |
| 9 | Stanislav Slaveykov | 1.98 | 6–6 | Forward | 1986 | (Bulgaria) Levski Sofia |
| 10 | Stefan Georgiev | 2.06 | 6–9 | Center | 1978 | (Bulgaria) Levski Sofia |
| 11 | Dimitar Angelov | 2.02 | 6–8 | Forward | 1979 | (Bulgaria) Lukoil Academic |
| 12 | Vassil Evtimov | 2.08 | 6–10 | Forward | 1977 | (Ukraine) Khimik Yuzhny |
| 13 | Boyko Mladenov | 2.12 | 6–11 | Center | 1981 | (Bulgaria) Levski Sofia |
| 14 | Bozhidar Avramov | 1.98 | 6–6 | Guard | 1990 | (Spain) Valencia BC |
| 15 | Todor Stoykov | 1.98 | 6–6 | Guard | 1977 | (Bulgaria) Lukoil Academic |
