= Tomčo Sokolov =

Personal information
- Born: March 1, 1984 (age 42) Strumica, Macedonia
- Listed height: 2.05 m (6 ft 9 in)

Career information
- NBA draft: 2006: undrafted
- Playing career: 1998–present
- Position: Power forward

Career history
- 1998–2002: Nemetali Ogražden
- 2002–2003: KK Hiron
- 2003–2004: Polo Trejd
- 2004–2005: Atlético Clube de Portugal
- 2005–2008: BC Strumica 2005
- 2008: CSU Asesoft
- 2008–2009: BC Steaua București
- 2009–2010: CS Dinamo București
- 2010–2011: Metallurg-University Magnitogorsk
- 2012: J.S.Kairouan
- 2012–2013: Pi Koleji Ankara
- 2013–2014: SKP Banska Bystrica
- 2014: BK 04 AC LB Spisska Nova Ves
- 2014–2015: Feni Industries
- 2015: Čelik
- 2015: Maribor
- 2015: Kožuv
- 2016: Strumica
- 2017: Morges-Saint-Prex Red Devils

Career highlights
- Macedonian First League (2007); Liga Națională (2008); Romanian Cup (2008)

Tomčo Sokolov (born March 1, 1984) is a former Macedonian professional basketball Power forward. in Macedonia.

== Professional career ==
During his career, Sokolov played in Croatia, Portugal, Romania, Russia, Tunisia, Turkey, Slovakia, Bosnia and Herzegovina and Slovenia.

On 18 March 2015, Sokolov has signed with KK Maribor.
