= Dimitar Mirakovski =

Macedonian basketball player

Personal information
- Born: May 14, 1981 (age 45) Strumica, SR Macedonia, Yugoslavia
- Listed height: 5 ft 10 in (1.78 m)
- Listed weight: 190 lb (86 kg)

Career information
- NBA draft: 2003: undrafted
- Playing career: 1999-2019–present
- Position: Point guard
- Coaching career: 2019-–present

Career history

Playing
- 1999–2001: Nemetali Ogražden
- 2001–2002: Kumanovo
- 2002: Vardar
- 2003: Gostivar
- 2003–2005: Vardar
- 2005–2006: Peja
- 2006–2007: CSKA Sofia
- 2007–2008: Rabotnički
- 2008–2009: Rethymno Aegean
- 2009: Feni Industries
- 2009: Rabotnički
- 2009–2010: Cherno More
- 2010–2013: Rabotnički
- 2013–2014: Kožuv
- 2014–2019: Rabotnički

Coaching
- 2019–2021: Rabotnički
- 2022–2024: Rabotnički

Career highlights
- Macedonian League champion (2018); 2× Macedonian Cup winner (2011, 2015); 2× Macedonian Super Cup MVP (2011, 2015)

Dimitar Mirakovski (born May 14, 1981), is a former Macedonian professional basketball player.

== Pro career ==
Since beginning his professional career in 1999, Mirakovski has spent the majority of his career playing in the Macedonian Premier League. He has also made brief stops in Kosovo with BC Peje, Bulgaria with CSKA Sofia and Greece with Rethymno BC. He is signed with KK Kavadarci of the Macedonian Premier League for the 2009-10 season after spending the 2008-09 season in Greece.

== Macedonian national team ==
Mirakovski is also a member of the Macedonian national basketball team. He competed with the team at Eurobasket 2009 and helped the team to a ninth-place finish, its best ever performance at the continental championship at that time.
