= KK Balkan Steel =

Balkan Steel
- Founded: 1999
- Dissolved: 2003
- Arena: Jane Sandanski Arena
- Location: Skopje, North Macedonia
- Team colors: Green and White
Home	Away

Balkan Steel is a defunct basketball club based in Skopje, North Macedonia. They played in the Macedonian First League until the season 2002/2003.

== Domestic achievements ==
- Macedonian Basketball Cup Semi-finalist - 2003

== Former players ==
- (North Macedonia) Gjorgji Talevski
- (North Macedonia) Risto Duganov
- (North Macedonia) Bojan Trajkovski
- (North Macedonia) Toni Grnčarov
- (North Macedonia) Joško Kafedzis
- (North Macedonia) Boris Nešović
- (North Macedonia) Darko Sokolov
- (North Macedonia) Zoran Nikolov
- (North Macedonia) Vasko Najkov
- (North Macedonia) Fore Kalpakov
- (North Macedonia) Borče Daskalovski
- (North Macedonia) Vladimir Georgievski
- (North Macedonia) Riste Stefanov
- (North Macedonia) Ilija Bocevski
- (Serbia) Vladimir Đokić
- (Serbia) Zoran Gavrilović
- (Serbia) Vlada Krupniković
- (Serbia) Igor Ratković
- (Slovenia) Blaž Ručigaj

== Former coaches ==
- (North Macedonia) Jordančo Davitkov
- (North Macedonia) Saša Dimitirijević
