= Toni Grnčarov =

Macedonian basketball player

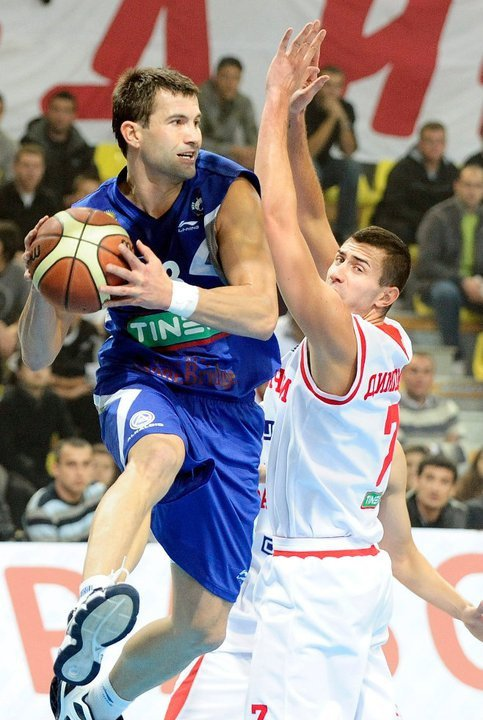
- Grncarov with MZT in 2010

Personal information
- Born: February 8, 1980 (age 46) Skopje, SR Macedonia, SFR Yugoslavia
- Listed height: 1.92 m (6 ft 4 in)
- Listed weight: 80 kg (176 lb)

Career information
- Playing career: 1996–2014
- Position: Shooting guard

Career history
- 1996–1999: Karpoš Sokoli
- 1999–2001: MZT Skopje
- 2001–2003: Balkan Steel
- 2003–2004: Nemetali Ogražden
- 2004–2006: Vardar
- 2006–2008: Strumica 2005
- 2008–2009: Feršped Rabotnički
- 2009–2010: Vardar Osiguruvanje
- 2010–2013: MZT Skopje
- 2013–2014: Strumica

Career highlights
- 3x Macedonian First League (2007, 2009, 2012)

Toni Grncarov (Macedonian: Тони Грнчаров; born February 8, 1980) is a former Macedonian professional basketball player born in Skopje. He is 1.92 m (6 ft 4 in) in height and played at the guard position. He is a brother of Boban Grnčarov, who is a football player in FK Vardar.

== Achievements ==
- Strumica 2005
  - Macedonian League Champion – 2007
- Rabotnicki
  - Macedonian League Champion – 2009
- MZT Skopje
  - Macedonian League Champion – 2012
  - Macedonian Cup Winner – 2000, 2012

== General manager ==
On 21 November 2017, he was appointed as General Manager of his former basketball club MZT Skopje until December 2021.
