= Eftim Bogoev =

Macedonian basketball player

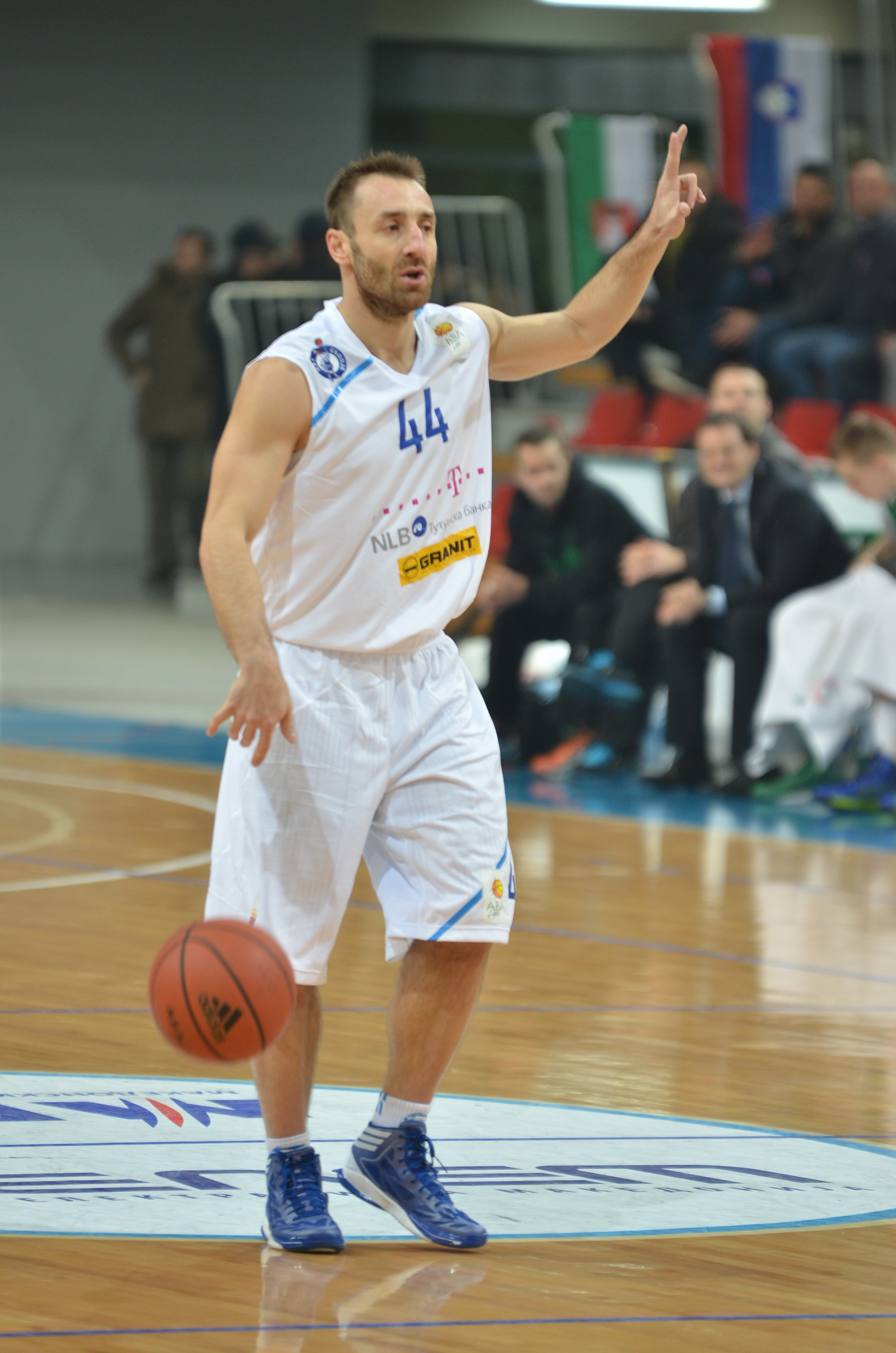
- Bogoev with MZT in 2013

Personal information
- Born: November 2, 1980 (age 46) Strumica, SR Macedonia, SFR Yugoslavia
- Listed height: 1.86 m (6 ft 1 in)
- Listed weight: 80 kg (176 lb)
- Position: Guard

Career history
- 1997–2002: Nemetali Ogražden
- 2002–2004: Polo Trejd
- 2004–2005: KAO Dramas
- 2005–2006: Rethymno Cretan
- 2006–2008: Strumica 2005
- 2008–2009: AMAK SP
- 2009: Sutjeska Fоča
- 2009–2010: Feni Industries
- 2010: Ovče Pole
- 2011–2012: Rabotnički
- 2012: Strumica
- 2013: MZT Skopje Aerodrom
- 2013–2014: Feni Industries
- 2015: Kožuv
- 2015–2017: Strumica

Career highlights
- MVP of Macedonian Cup season 2009; MVP of Macedonian Cup season 2010

Eftim Bogoev (Macedonian: Ефтим Богоев; born November 2, 1980) is a Macedonian professional basketball player born in Strumica. He was last under contract with Strumica. He is 1.85 m (6 ft 1 in) in height and plays the guard position.

== Achievements ==
- (North Macedonia) Strumica 2005
  - Macedonian League Champion - 2007
- (North Macedonia) Feni Industri
  - Macedonian League Champion - 2010
- (North Macedonia) MZT Aerodrom
  - Macedonian League Champion - 2013
- (North Macedonia) AMAK SP
  - Macedonian Cup Champion - 2009
- (North Macedonia) Feni Industri
  - Macedonian Cup Champion - 2010
- (North Macedonia) Rabotnicki
  - Macedonian Cup Champion - 2011
- (North Macedonia) MZT Aerodrom
  - Macedonian Cup Champion - 2013
