= Zoran Nikolov =

Macedonian basketball player

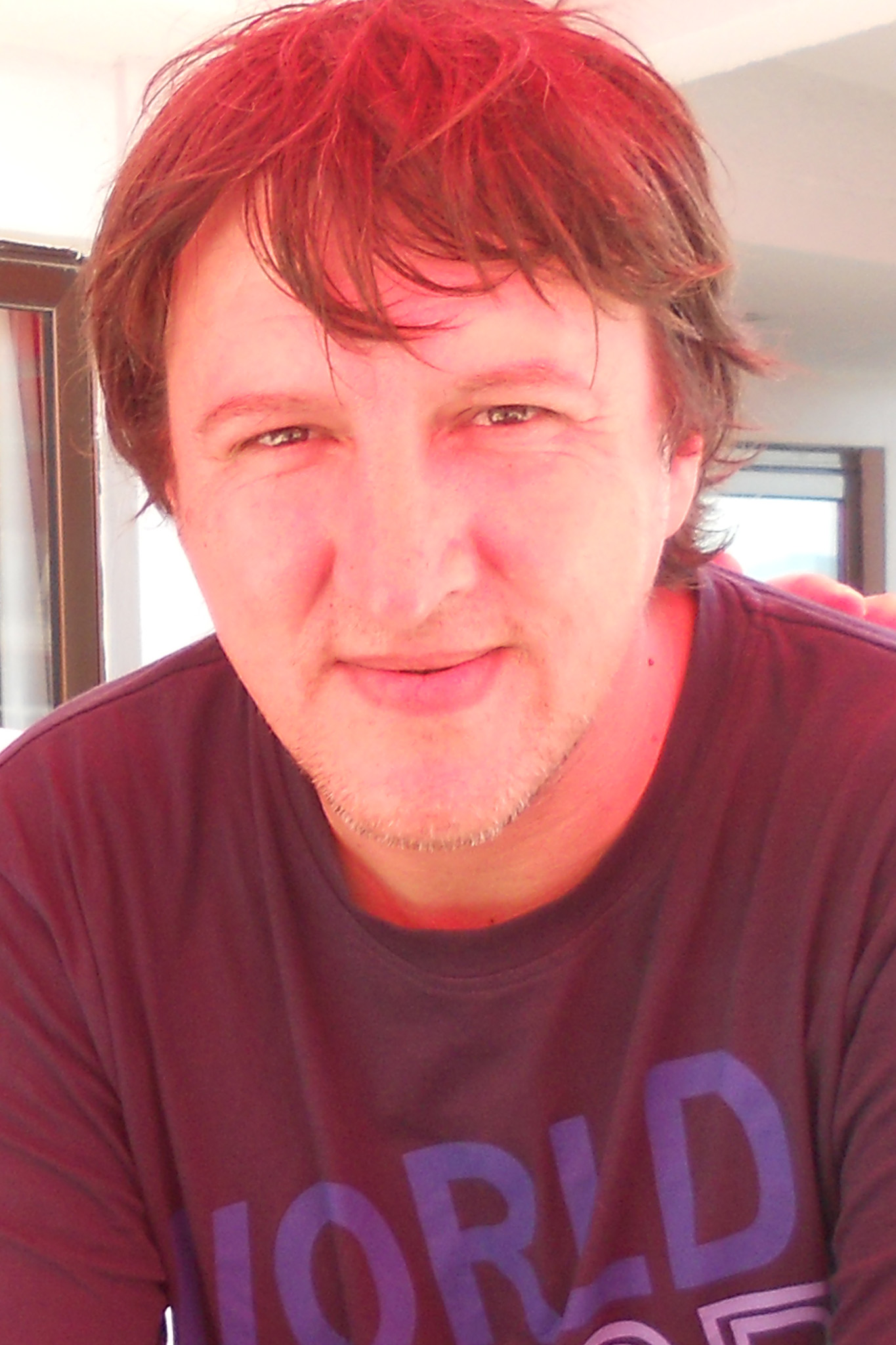

Personal information
- Born: 2 February 1970 (age 56)
- Listed height: 1.94 m (6 ft 4 in)
- Position: Shooting guard / small forward

Career history
- 1992–1996: Nemetali Ogražden
- 1996–1997: Orka Kavadarci
- 1997–1998: Kumanovo
- 1998–2001: Žito Vardar
- 2001–2002: Balkan Steel
- 2002–2003: Žito Vardar
- 2003: Polo Trejd
- 2004: KB Vëllaznimi
- 2004–2006: Polo Trejd

Zoran Nikolov (born 2 February 1970) is a former Macedonian professional basketball Swingman who played for Žito Vardar, Nemetali Ogražden, Kumanovo, Balkan Steel, KB Peja and Teteks.

His son Kristijan Nikolov is also a basketball player. He is a member of MZT Skopje
