= Nikola Kicev =

Macedonian basketball player

EuroNickel 2005
- Position: Shooting guard
- League: Macedonian First League

Personal information
- Born: April 6, 1998 (age 28) Kavadarci, Macedonia
- Listed height: 1.85 m (6 ft 1 in)

Career information
- Playing career: 2013–present

Career history
- 2013–present: EuroNickel 2005

Nikola Kicev (born April 6, 1998) is a Macedonian professional basketball Shooting guard who currently plays for EuroNickel 2005 in the Macedonian First League.
