= Vasko Atanasov =

Macedonian basketball coach

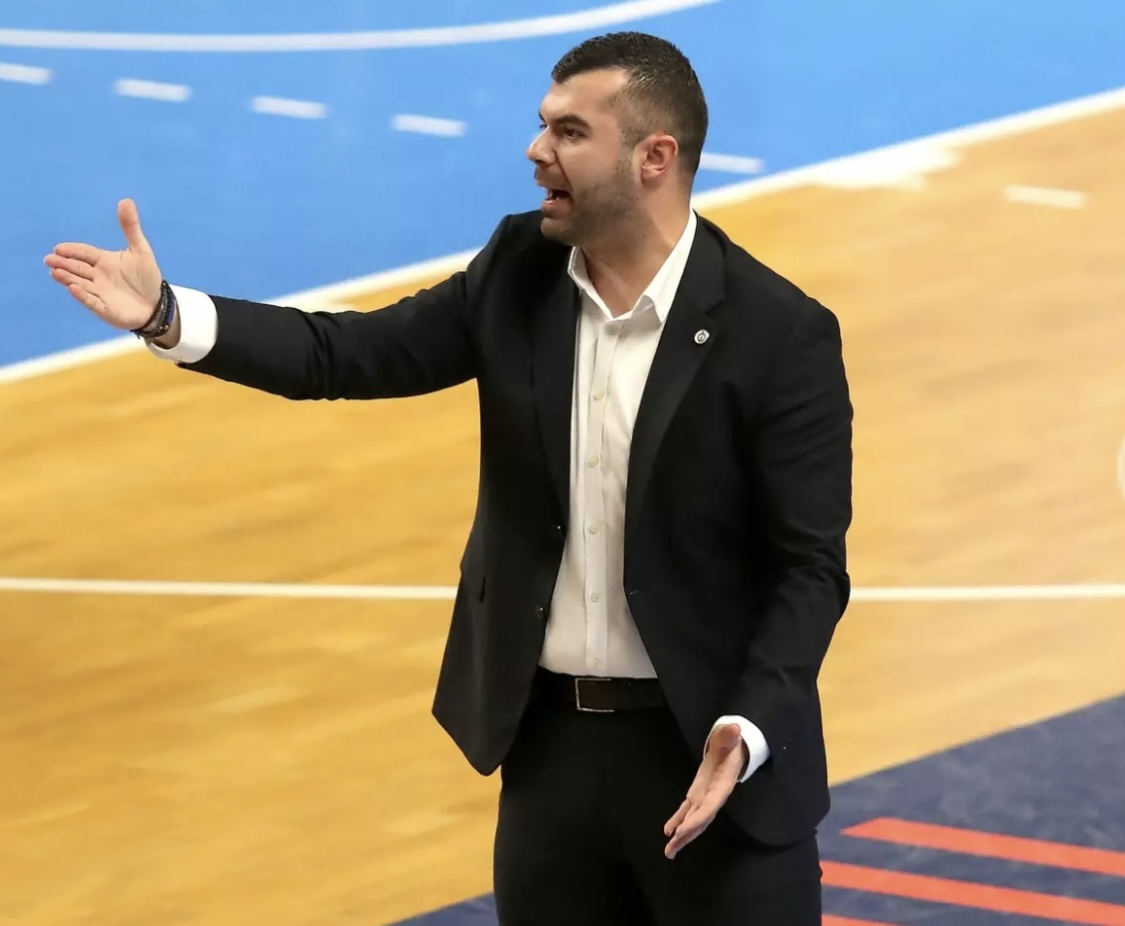

Personal information
- Born: April 14, 1994 (age 32) Strumica, Macedonia
- Position: Coach

Career history
- 2015–2016: Admirals Chisinau
- 2017–2018: Strumica
- 2022–2023: MZT Skopje (ass.coach)
- 2023–2026: MZT Skopje

Career highlights
- 4x Macedonian League Champion (2023, 2024, 2025, 2026); 3x Macedonian Cup Winner (2024, 2025, 2026); 3x Macedonian Super Cup Winner (2023, 2024, 2025)

Vasko Atanasov (Macedonian: Васко Атанасов; born April 14, 1994) is a Macedonian basketball coach.

== Professional career ==
Atanasov started his professional career in his hometown team of Strumica as an assistant coach, before moving to the Moldovan League in 2015 to lead the Chisinau Admirals.

Coming back to his hometown for his second stint with the team of Stumica, he became the youngest head coach to lead a team in the Macedonian league.

In June 2023, he became the youngest head coach ever to win a title in Macedonian basketball history.

On July 27, 2023, he signed a new contract with MZT Skopje. On May 25, 2024, Atanasov won the second title with MZT Skopje as coach against Pelister in the Macedonian Final., becoming only the second coach to ever win back-to-back titles with the same club.

On July 12, 2024, he re-signed a new contract with MZT Skopje for another year. On September 28, 2024, he won the Macedonian Super cup for the second time in his career.
