= Gjorgji Čekovski =

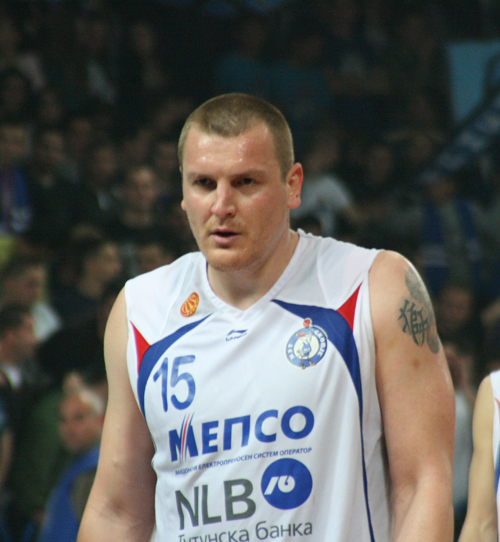
- Čekovski with MZT in 2011

Personal information
- Born: December 11, 1979 (age 46) Skopje, SR Macedonia, SFR Yugoslavia
- Listed height: 2.02 m (6 ft 8 in)
- Listed weight: 150 kg (331 lb)

Career information
- Playing career: 1997–2019
- Position: Power forward

Career history
- 1997–1998: Alumina
- 1998–2003: Rabotnički
- 2003: Geoplin Slovan
- 2004: Sigal Prishtina
- 2004–2007: Lukoil Academic
- 2007–2008: Cherkaski Mavpy
- 2008: Feni Industries
- 2009: Ferro-ZNTU
- 2009: Rabotnički
- 2010–2011: Levski Sofia
- 2011–2014: MZT Skopje
- 2014–2015: Rabotnički
- 2015: Sigal Prishtina
- 2015–2019: Rabotnički

Career highlights
- 9× Macedonian First League (1998, 1999, 2001–2003, 2012–2014, 2018); 6× Macedonian Cup (1998, 2003, 2012–2015); 3× Bulgarian League (2005–2007); 5× Bulgarian Cup (2006, 2007); 3× Macedonian Final MVP (2001–2013); 2× Macedonian Cup MVP (2003, 2015)

Gjorgji "Stanko" Čekovski (Macedonian: Ѓорѓи Чековски; born December 11, 1979) is a Macedonian professional basketball player. He was also a member of the Macedonian national basketball team.

== Macedonian national team ==
Čekovski is also a member of the Macedonian national basketball team. He competed with the team at Eurobasket 2011 and helped the team to a fourth-place finish, its best ever performance at the continental championship. In the group game against Greece, he was one of the heroes, scoring 11 points including three three-pointers and playing great defense to secure the win.

At the Eurobasket 2013, Čekovski suffered a muscle tear in the second game of the group stage against Lithuania, which was the end of the tournament for the power forward. Macedonia sorely missed Čekovski's presence, as the team ended in last place in the Group B.

== Career statistics ==
Legend
GP	Games played	GS	Games started	MPG	Minutes per game
FG%	Field-goal percentage	3P%	3-point field-goal percentage	FT%	Free-throw percentage
RPG	Rebounds per game	APG	Assists per game	SPG	Steals per game
BPG	Blocks per game	PPG	Points per game	PIR	Performance index rating
**Bold**	Career high

=== Eurocup ===
Year	Team	GP	GS	MPG	FG%	3P%	FT%	RPG	APG	SPG	BPG	PPG	PIR
2004–05	Lukoil Academic	12	11	29.3	.425	.414	.471	5.1	0.8	0.8	0.0	8.8	7.3
2005-06	Lukoil Academic	11	10	25.1	.439	.341	.846	4.2	0.5	1.6	0.1	8.8	7.6
2004–05	Lukoil Academic	10	10	28.2	.430	.383	.400	5.5	0.7	1.0	0.1	9.2	6.1
2013–14	MZT Skopje Aerodrom	8	4	21.0	.429	.308	.727	3.5	0.6	0.6	0.1	9.0	6.8

=== Domestic leagues ===
Season	Team	League	GP	MPG	FG%	3P%	FT%	RPG	APG	SPG	BPG	PPG
2003–04	Geoplin Slovan	ABA League	12	14.8	.404	.344	1.000	1.4	0.7	0.5	0.0	4.5
2012–13	MZT Skopje	ABA League	25	27.9	.460	.363	.629	5.2	1.8	0.9	0.0	12.1
2013–14	MZT Skopje	ABA League	23	23.3	.410	.308	.724	3.6	1.1	0.6	0.4	9.2
