= Savvas Manousos =

Greek basketball player

Savvas Manousos Σάββας Μανούσος
AS Evropi Pefkohori
- Position: Power forward / center
- League: Greek A2 Basket League

Personal information
- Born: 4 July 1985 (age 41) Thessaloniki, Greece
- Listed height: 6 ft 10 in (2.08 m)
- Listed weight: 256 lb (116 kg)

Career information
- NBA draft: 2007: undrafted
- Playing career: 2005–present

Career history
- 2005: KAOD
- 2006: Panevėžys
- 2006: AEL 1964
- 2006–2007: Strumica 2005
- 2007–2008: Apollon Patras
- 2008–2009: Olympiada Patras
- 2009–2010: AEL Limassol
- 2010–2011: Anagenissi Flogas
- 2011–2012: BK NH Ostrava
- 2012–2013: Doxa Lefkadas
- 2013–2014: Lavrio
- 2014–2015: Ermis Lagkada
- 2015–2016: Doxa Lefkadas
- 2016–2017: Kavala
- 2017: CB L'Hospitalet
- 2017–2018: Union Dax-Gamarde
- 2018–present: AS Evropi Pefkohori

Career highlights
- Greek 2nd Division Top Rebounder (2015)

Savvas Manousos (Greek: Σάββας Μανούσος) (born 4 July 1985) is a Greek professional basketball player for Union Dax-Gamarde of the Nationale Masculine 2. Born in Thessaloniki, Greece, he can play both the power forward and the center positions. He is 2.08 m (6 ft 10 in) in height.

== Player profile ==
Manousos is a right-handed, strong player and pesky defender. He can play the power forward and the center positions. Manousos played at PAOK youth teams. During 2002–03 season he has contract with the first team, but he was uncapped.

== Professional career ==
Manousos began his professional career in 2005 with KAOD in the Greek 2nd Division. The same year, he joined Panevėžys of the Lithuanian Basketball League, where he stayed until the end of the season. He then played with the Greek 1st Division club AEL 1964, during the 2005–06 season, and then with Strumica during the same season.

He then played for two seasons at Patras with Apollon Patras and Olympiada Patras before joining the Cypriot 1st Division side AEL Limassol. In 2010, he moved to Anagenisi Flogas at Thessaloniki before leaving Greece in order to sign with the Slovak club BK NH Ostrava.

He returned at Greece and joined Doxa Lefkadas, where he stayed for one season. He then played for Lavrio and Ermis Lagkada in the Greek 2nd Division.

On 23 August 2015 he signed with the Greek club Doxa Lefkadas. He then joined Kavala of the Greek 2nd Division. On 5 January 2017 Manousos left Kavala due to financial problems and signed with CB L'Hospitalet of Spain for the rest of the 2016–17 season.
