= Macedonian Prva Liga (disambiguation) =

The Macedonian Prva Liga may refer to two top-tier sporting competitions in North Macedonia:

- the Macedonian Prva Liga (basketball)
- the Macedonian Prva Liga (football)
