= Marjan Gjurov =

Macedonian basketball player

Personal information
- Born: May 4, 1980 (age 46) Štip, Macedonia
- Listed height: 2.01 m (6 ft 7 in)
- Listed weight: 97 kg (214 lb)

Career information
- Playing career: 1998–2015
- Position: Small forward

Career history
- 1998–2006: Rabotnički
- 2006–2007: Vardar Osiguruvanje
- 2007–2012: Feni Industries
- 2012–2015: Rabotnički

Career highlights
- 10× Macedonian League champion (1999, 2001–2006, 2008, 2010, 2011); 8× Macedonian Cup winner (2003–2006, 2008, 2010, 2011)

Marjan Gjurov (born May 4, 1980) is a Macedonian professional basketball small forward who last played for Rabotnički.
