= Jordančo Davitkov =

Basketball coach

Personal information
- Born: September 12, 1963 (age 63) Kočani, SFR Yugoslavia
- Listed height: 1.95 m (6 ft 5 in)

Career information
- Playing career: 1981–1998
- Position: Guard
- Coaching career: 2000–present

Career history

Playing
- 1981–1998: Rabotnički
- 1998–2000: Nikol Fert

Coaching
- 2000–2002: Nikol Fert
- 2001-2007: Macedonia
- 2003: Polo Trejd
- 2003: Balkan Steel
- 2003–2004: Nemetali Ogražden
- 2004–2007: Rabotnički
- 2007–2008: Strumica 2005
- 2008: Snæfell
- 2008–2011: Al Qadsia
- 2011–2012: Al Jahraa
- 2011–2012: Kuwait
- 2012–2013: Al Wasl Dubai
- 2015–2017: Al-Shaab CSC
- 2017–2019: Macedonia
- 2017: Baniyas Club
- 2018–2020: Al Qadsia
- 2021: KB Peja
- 2021–2022: CSM Târgu Jiu
- 2022–2023: Strumica
- 2023–2024: Gostivar

Jordanco Davitkov (born 12 September 1963 in Kočani, Macedonian: Јорданчо Давитков) is a former coach of the Macedonian National Basketball Team, and the Kuwait national basketball team. In 2011 on Gulf Games in Bahrain, with Kuwait National Team, won bronze medal. In 2009, 2010, 2011, three times in a row Davitkov was the Champion of Kuwait with BC Qadsia. With Qadsia also won Cup of Kuwait 2010 and Gulf Championship 2009. Since 2001 until 2007 Davitkov was Head coach of Macedonian National Team. He led Macedonia in the qualifying for the European Championships in 2003, as well as when Macedonia was in Second European Division in 2004 and 2005, and during the first phase of the qualifying for the European Championships in Spain 2007. Since 2000 until 2008 he was Head coach of KK Nikol Fert, KK Strumica 2005, Balkan Steel Skopje, and the best Macedonian team KK Rabotnicki. As a coach he had won two Championship titles and two Cup titles in Macedonia. Three times(2004, 2005, 2006) he was announced as a best basketball coach in Macedonia. Twenty years he was professional player(18 years in the best Macedonian club "Rabotnicki". In this time he won seven Championship Titles and five Cup titles. He has played for Young Yugoslavian National Team and he was the first captain of The Macedonian National Team.

In May 2008, he was hired as the head coach of Úrvalsdeild karla club Snæfell. After guiding the team during the Company Cup he, along with the foreign players of the club, were released in early October due to the club's financial situation in the wake of the 2008 Icelandic financial crisis.
