= Ivan Bošnjak =

Ivan Bošnjak may refer to:

- Ivan Bošnjak (footballer) (born 1979), Croatian footballer
- Ivan Bošnjak (basketball) (born 1982), Serbian basketball player
- Ivan Bošnjak (politician) (born 1974), Serbian politician
