= Darko Sokolov =

Macedonian basketball player

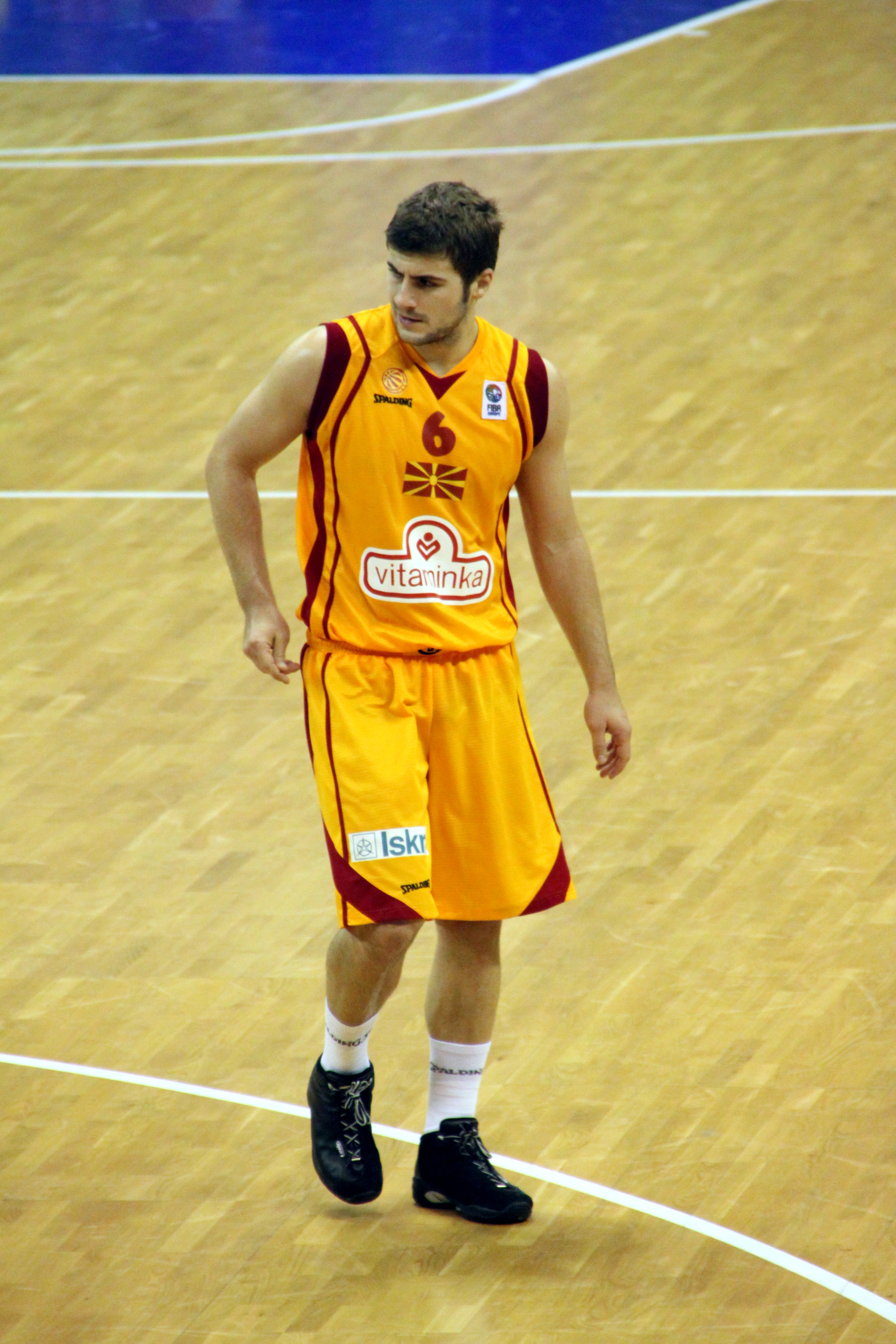
- Sokolov in 2009

KK Feniks 2010
- Position: Shooting guard
- League: Macedonian First League

Personal information
- Born: May 8, 1986 (age 40) Kočani, SR Macedonia, SFR Yugoslavia
- Listed height: 6 ft 2.75 in (1.90 m)
- Listed weight: 190 lb (86 kg)

Career information
- Playing career: 2002–present

Career history
- 2002–2003: Balkan Steel
- 2003: Centar Skopje
- 2004: Polo Trejd
- 2004–2006: Vardar
- 2006: Bosna
- 2006: AMAK SP
- 2007: Khimik Yuzhny
- 2007–2008: Strumica 2005
- 2008–2009: Feni Industries
- 2009: MZT Skopje
- 2009: Rabotnički
- 2010–2013: Feni Industries
- 2013–2015: Rabotnički
- 2015–2017: Karpoš Sokoli
- 2017–2019: MZT Skopje
- 2019–2024: EuroNickel 2005
- 2024–2025: Gostivar
- 2026–present: KK Feniks 2010

Career highlights
- Balkan League champion (2011); 2× Macedonian League champion (2011, 2019); 4× Macedonian Cup winner (2010, 2015, 2017, 2018)

Darko Sokolov (Macedonian: Дарко Соколов; born May 8, 1986) is a Macedonian professional basketball player.

== Professional career ==
Since beginning his professional career in 2002, Sokolov has spent the majority of his career playing in the Macedonian First League with Feni Industries, BC Strumica 2005, Rabotnički, MZT Skopje, Vardar, Balkan Steel, Centar and Karpoš Sokoli. He has also made brief stops in Ukraine with Khimik Yuzhny and Bosnia and Herzegovina with KK Bosna. On 20 November 2017, he left Karpoš Sokoli due to financial problems. On November 22, 2017, he signed with MZT Skopje.

== National team ==
Sokolov is also a member of the Macedonian national basketball team. He competed with the team at Eurobasket 2009 and helped the team to a ninth-place finish, its best ever performance at the time. In 2011, him and his team reached the semi-finals of Eurobasket defeating Lithuania, the host.
