= 2017 Macedonian Basketball Cup =

2017 Macedonian Cup
- Season: 2017
- Dates: 17–19 February 2017
- Games played: 7
- Teams: 8

Regular season
- Season MVP: (Croatia) Dominik Mavra

Finals
- Champions: Karpoš Sokoli (1st title)
- Runners-up: Feni Industries

The 2017 Macedonian Basketball Cup was the 25th season of the Macedonian Basketball Cup. The Final Eight was held in the Jasmin Sports Hall in Kavadarci from 17 February until 19 February 2017. Karpoš Sokoli won its first cup in club history.

== Bracket ==
Quarterfinals; 17 February
Rabotnički	87
Kumanovo 2009	81
Karpoš Sokoli	92
Vardar	82
MZT Skopje Aerodrom	83
Kozuv	72
Feni Industries	112
AV Ohrid	69

Semifinals; 18 February
Rabotnički	78
Karpoš Sokoli	92
MZT Skopje Aerodrom	79
Feni Industries	80

Final; 19 February
Karpoš Sokoli	80
Feni Industries	69
