= KK Nemetali Ogražden =

Nemetali Ogražden
- Founded: 1949
- Dissolved: 2004
- Arena: Sports Hall Park (capacity: 4,000)
- Location: Strumica, North Macedonia
- Team colors: Green and Black
Home	Away

Nemetali Ogražden is a defunct basketball club based in Strumica, North Macedonia. They played in the Macedonian First League until the season 2003/2004. In 2004 the club declared bankruptcy because of financial problems.

== Domestic achievements ==
- Macedonian League Semi-finalist - 2004
- Macedonian Cup Finalist - 2004

== Former players ==
- (North Macedonia) Vlado Ilievski
- (North Macedonia) Petar Nastev
- (North Macedonia) Stojan Madžunkov
- (North Macedonia) Risto Duganov
- (North Macedonia) Dimče Gaštarski
- (North Macedonia) Eftim Bogoev
- (North Macedonia) Antonio Minevski
- (North Macedonia) Goce Andrevski
- (North Macedonia) Toni Grnčarov
- (North Macedonia) Tomčo Sokolov
- (North Macedonia) Zoran Nikolov
- (North Macedonia) Borče Domlevski
- (North Macedonia) Marjan Ilievski
- (Serbia) Milorad Kmezić
- (Serbia) Predrag Joksimović
- (Serbia) Njegoš Abazović

== Former coaches ==
- (North Macedonia) Jordančo Davitkov

== Rivalries ==
- KK Nemetali Ogražden in the past had traditional rivalry games with Makedonija 91.
