= Mihajlo Mitev =

Macedonian basketball player

Free agent
- Position: Point guard

Personal information
- Born: August 30, 1997 (age 29) Štip, Macedonia
- Listed height: 1.91 m (6 ft 3 in)

Career information
- Playing career: 2016–present

Career history
- 2016–2017: Vardar
- 2017–2019: MZT Skopje
- 2017–2018: → Strumica

Career highlights
- North Macedonia League champion (2019)

Mihajlo Mitev (born August 30, 1997) is a Macedonian professional basketball Point guard who last played for MZT Skopje.
