= Nenad Zivčević =

Macedonian–Serbian basketball player

Personal information
- Born: February 28, 1986 (age 40) Skopje, SFR Yugoslavia
- Listed height: 2.04 m (6 ft 8 in)

Career information
- Playing career: 2004–present
- Position: Power forward

Career history
- 2004–2007: Budućnost
- 2007: → Sloga Kraljevo
- 2007–2009: Rabotnički
- 2009–2010: Plejmejker Cubus
- 2010–2011: MZT Skopje Aerodrom
- 2011: Politekhnika-Halychyna
- 2012: Lirija
- 2012: Sundsvall Dragons
- 2012–2013: Rabotnički
- 2013–2014: Al Arabi
- 2014: MZT Skopje Aerodrom
- 2015–2016: Chabab Rif Al Hoceima
- 2016: Strumica
- 2017: Dalia Sportive de Grombalia
- 2017–2018: Al Ahli
- 2018–2019: Alexandria Sporting Club
- 2019: Al Dhafra
- 2019–2020: Al Shrooq
- 2020: Telecom Egypt SC
- 2020–2023: Kumanovo
- 2023–2024: Klik Arilje
- 2024–2025: Gostivar

Career highlights
- Macedonian League champion (2009)
Medals
Men's basketball
Representing Serbia
U20 European Championship
Gold medal – first place	2007 Slovenia	Team
Representing Serbia and Montenegro
U18 European Championship
Gold medal – first place	2005 Serbia and Montenegro	Team
European Championship for Cadets
Gold medal – first place	2003 Spain	Team

Nenad Zivčević (born February 28, 1986) is a former Macedonian and Serbian professional basketball player.

== Achievements ==
- The best scorer in 2017/2018 in Qatar league with 26ppg
- The best scorer in Bahrain 2018 with 31ppg
- The best scorer in Saudi Arabia 2020 with 33.3ppg
