= Stevan Gligorijević =

Macedonian/Serbian basketball player

Personal information
- Born: March 8, 1997 (age 29) Bor, FR Yugoslavia
- Listed height: 2.05 m (6 ft 9 in)
- Listed weight: 109 kg (240 lb)

Career information
- Playing career: 2014–present
- Position: Power forward

Career history
- 2014–2016: KK Zicer Bor
- 2016–2018: AV Ohrid
- 2018–2019: Blokotehna
- 2019–2020: Rabotnički
- 2020–2022: Kumanovo
- 2022–2022: Prievidza
- 2022–2023: Kumanovo
- 2023–2026: Tikvesh

Stevan Gligorijević (born March 8, 1997) is a Macedonian/Serbian professional basketball Power forward who currently plays for Tikvesh in the Macedonian First League (basketball).
