= Nenad Delić =

Croatian basketball player

Personal information
- Born: April 22, 1984 (age 42) Split, SR Croatia, SFR Yugoslavia
- Listed height: 2.10 m (6 ft 11 in)
- Listed weight: 104 kg (229 lb)

Career information
- Playing career: 2002–present
- Position: Center

Career history
- 2002–2004: Split
- 2004: EWE Oldenburg
- 2006–2007: Starwings Basel
- 2007–2008: Strumica 2005
- 2008: Darda
- 2008–2009: Slavonski Brod
- 2009–2010: Starwings Basel
- 2010–2011: MBK Baník Handlová
- 2011–2012: Genç Telekom SK
- 2012: TED Ankara Kolejliler
- 2013: Inter Bratislava
- 2013–2014: İstanbul DSİ
- 2014–2015: Baniyas Club
- 2015–2016: KB Peja
- 2016: Rilski Sportist
- 2016–2017: Sigal Prishtina
- 2017: Karpoš Sokoli
- 2018: Étoile Sportive du Sahel
- 2018–2019: Komarno
- 2019–2020: BC Prievidza
- 2020: ÍR
- 2020–2021: KK Omis-Cagalj
- 2021: Dinamo Zagreb
- 2022: Basket Casapulla
- 2023: Mondo Camerette Caserta
- 2023–2024: Omis-Cagalj

Nenad Delić (born April 22, 1984) is a Croatian professional basketball Center who plays for Étoile Sportive du Sahel of Tunisian Division I.
