= Damir Latović =

Serbian basketball player

Personal information
- Born: July 10, 1980 (age 46) Belgrade, Serbia
- Listed height: 2.04 m (6 ft 8 in)
- Listed weight: 110 kg (243 lb)

Career information
- College: Pasadena CC (1999–2000); Pensacola State (2000–2001); Montana State (2001–2002)
- Playing career: 2002–2017
- Position: Power forward

Career history
- 2002–2003: Elektra Šoštanj
- 2003–2004: Irakleio
- 2005–2006: Rethymno
- 2006–2007: Kolossos Rodou
- 2007–2008: Strumica 2005
- 2008–2009: Pagrati
- 2009–2014: Rethymno
- 2014–2015: Psychiko
- 2015–2016: Ethnikos Piraeus
- 2016–2017: Irakleio

Career highlights
- First-team All-Big Sky (2002); Big Sky Newcomer of the Year (2002)

Damir Latović (born July 10, 1980) is a retired Serbian professional basketball player.
