= Vladimir Popović (basketball) =

Serbian basketball player

Personal information
- Born: April 10, 1982 (age 44) Valjevo, SR Serbia, SFR Yugoslavia
- Listed height: 1.91 m (6 ft 3 in)

Career information
- NBA draft: 2004: undrafted
- Playing career: 2000–2013
- Position: Guard

Career history
- 2001–2003: Pivovarna Laško
- 2003–2005: Sloga Societe Generale
- 2005–2007: Rabotnički
- 2007–2008: Feni Industries
- 2008–2009: Swisslion Takovo
- 2009–2010: Feni Industries
- 2011–2012: Vizura
- 2012–2013: OKK Beograd
- 2013: Tamiš

Vladimir Popović (born April 4, 1982) is a Serbian former professional basketball player.
