= Ivan Bošnjak (basketball) =

Serbian basketball player

Free agent
- Position: Guard

Personal information
- Born: May 17, 1982 (age 44) Langen, Hesse, Germany
- Listed height: 2.00 m (6 ft 7 in)

Career history
- 2001–2005: Lavovi 063
- 2005–2007: Vojvodina
- 2007–2008: Strumica 2005
- 2008–2009: Feni Industries
- 2009–2011: Vojvodina
- 2011–2012: Cherkaski Mavpy
- 2012–2013: CS Municipal Bucuresti
- 2013–2014: CSA Steaua București
- 2014–2015: CSU Craiova
- 2015: BC Yambol

Ivan Bošnjak (born May 17, 1982) is a Serbian professional basketball player who last played for BC Yambol.
