= Vlaikidis Vlasios =

Greek basketball coach (born 1965)

Personal information
- Born: September 7, 1965 (age 61) Katerini, Greece

Career information
- College: University of Novi Sad

Career history

Coaching
- 1996–2001: Panathinaikos (youth)
- 1986–1989: Vojvodina (youth)
- 1989–1991: P.A.O.K. (assistant)
- 1991–1996: Panathinaikos (assistant)
- 2001–2005: Aris (assistant)
- 2005–2006: Strumica 2005 (assistant)
- 2006–2007: Strumica 2005
- 2011–2012: Iwate Big Bulls
- 2013–2014: Shimane Susanoo Magic
- 2017–2018: Strumica
- 2024-2025: SKN St. Pölten Basketball (assistant and youth)

Vlaikidis Vlasios (born September 7, 1965) is a Greek professional basketball coach.

He is the former head coach of the Shimane Susanoo Magic in the Japanese B.League.

== Head coaching record ==
Legend
Regular season	G	Games coached	W	Games won	L	Games lost	W–L %	Win–loss %
Playoffs	PG	Playoff games	PW	Playoff wins	PL	Playoff losses	PW–L %	Playoff win–loss %

Team	Year	G	W	L	W–L%	Finish	PG	PW	PL	PW–L%	Result
Iwate Big Bulls	2011–12	26	7	19	.269	Fired	-	-	-	–	-
Shimane Susanoo Magic	2013–14	26	5	21	.192	Fired	-	-	-	–	-
SKN St. Pölten Basketball SLMU14	2024-25	14	0	14	.000	Fired	-	-	-	–	-
