= Macedonian Basketball Super Cup =

The Macedonian Basketball Super Cup (Macedonian: Кошаркарски Супер куп на Македонија), is a basketball tournament held annually. It is the third most important national title in Macedonian basketball after the Macedonian First League and Macedonian Basketball Cup. Currently, MZT Skopje Aerodrom holds the record for most titles won with 7, and Rabotnički and Nikol Fert with 2.

== Past champions ==
Season	Champion	Runner-up	Result	MVP	Host city
2000	Nikol Fert	MZT Skopje Aerodrom			Gostivar
2001	Feršped Rabotnički	Nikol Fert		(North Macedonia) Goran Samardziev	Skopje
2002	Nikol Fert	Feršped Rabotnički	78-74	(Serbia) Miloš Goloskoković	Skopje
2003	MZT Skopje Aerodrom	Feršped Rabotnički	77-75	(North Macedonia) Đorđe Vojnović	Skopje
2007	Strumica 2005	Vardar Osiguruvanje	99-62	(North Macedonia) Dime Tasovski	Strumica
2011	Rabotnički	Feni Industries	88-83	(North Macedonia) Dimitar Mirakovski	Kavadarci
2015	MZT Skopje Aerodrom	Rabotnički	81-62	(North Macedonia) Dimitar Mirakovski	Ohrid
2016	MZT Skopje Aerodrom	Karpoš Sokoli	87-84	(United States) Torey Thomas	Skopje
2021	MZT Skopje Aerodrom	Rabotnički	79-78	N/A	Skopje
2022	MZT Skopje Aerodrom	TFT	100-82	N/A	Skopje
2023	MZT Skopje Aerodrom	Feniks 2010	74-54	N/A	Skopje
2024	MZT Skopje Aerodrom	Pelister	78-64	N/A	Skopje
2025	MZT Skopje Aerodrom	Kozuv	71-65	N/A	Skopje
2026	MZT Skopje Aerodrom	Kumanovo	70–68	N/A	Kumanovo

== Performance by club ==
Club	Winner	Year
MZT Skopje Aerodrom	9	2003, 2015, 2016, 2021, 2022, 2023, 2024, 2025, 2026
Rabotnički	2	2001, 2011
Nikol Fert Gostivar	2	2000, 2002
