= Damjan Stojanovski =

Macedonian professional basketball player

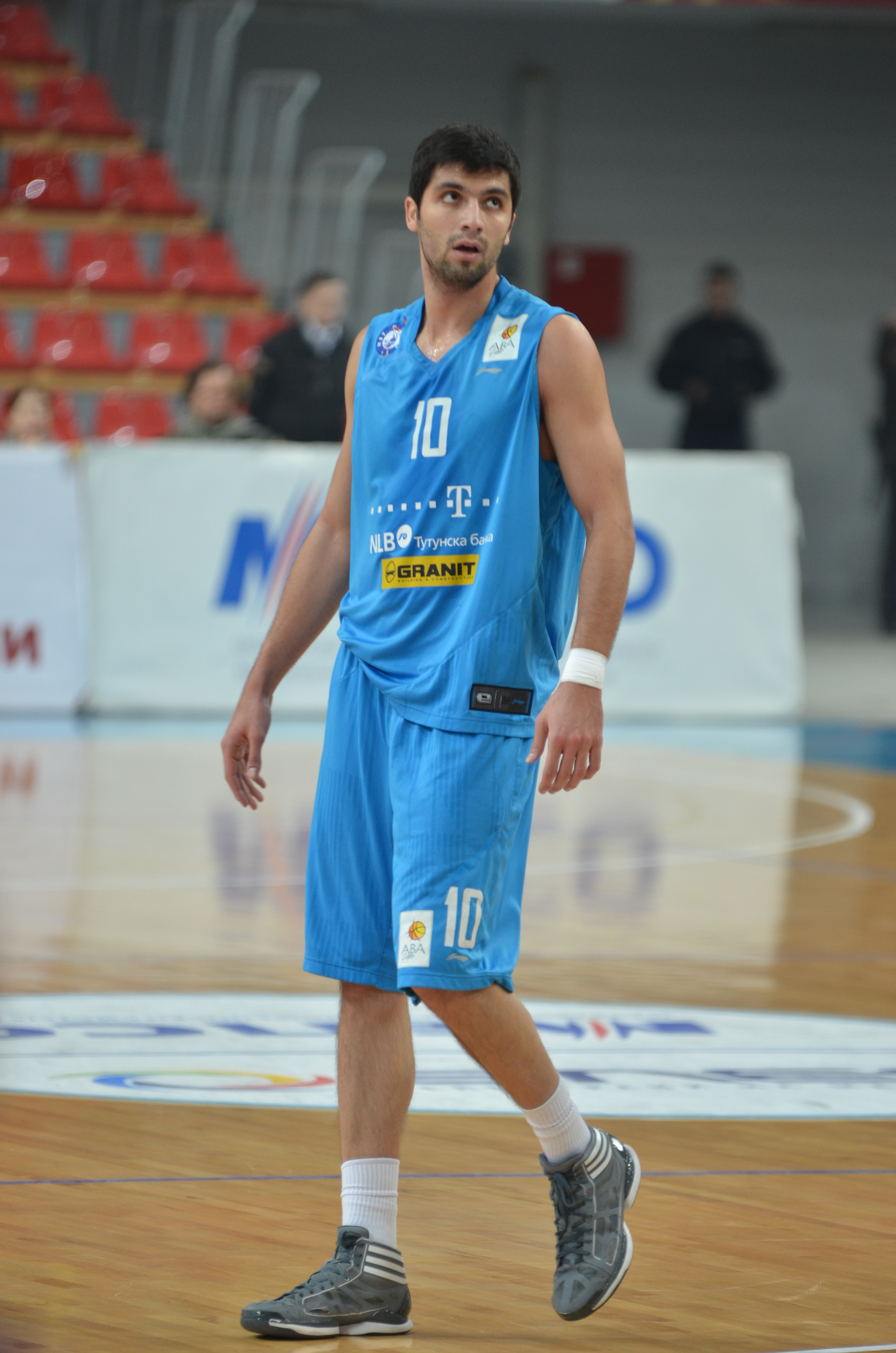
- Stojanovski with MZT in 2012

No. 19 – MZT Skopje
- Position: Shooting guard / small forward
- League: Macedonian League; ABA 2

Personal information
- Born: December 9, 1987 (age 38) Skopje, SR Macedonia, Yugoslavia
- Listed height: 1.98 m (6 ft 6 in)
- Listed weight: 87 kg (192 lb)

Career information
- Playing career: 2005–present

Career history
- 2005–2007: Vardar
- 2007–2009: AMAK SP
- 2009–2010: Vardar Osiguruvanje
- 2010–2012: Lukoil Academic
- 2012–present: MZT Skopje

Career highlights
- 2× Bulgarian League (2011, 2012); 2× Bulgarian Cup (2011, 2012); 11× Macedonian League (2013, 2014, 2015, 2016, 2019, 2021, 2022, 2023, 2024, 2025, 2026); 11× Macedonian Cup (2007, 2009, 2013, 2014, 2016, 2018, 2021, 2023, 2024, 2025, 2026); 3× Macedonian Cup MVP (2013, 2018, 2021); 5× Macedonian League Finals MVP (2010, 2014, 2016, 2019, 2024); 8× Macedonian Super Cup (2015, 2016, 2021, 2022, 2023, 2024, 2025, 2026); 1x Best Macedonian basketball player (2025)

Damjan Stojanovski (Macedonian: Дамјан Стојановски; born December 9, 1987) is a Macedonian professional basketball player who currently plays for MZT Skopje Aerodrom. He also represents the Macedonian national basketball team. He is 1.98 m (6 ft 6 in) in height and plays at the shooting guard and small forward positions.

He is a twin brother of Vojdan Stojanovski and the younger brother of former basketball player Ognen Stojanovski.

== Pro career ==
Since beginning his professional career in 2005, Stojanovski has spent the majority of his career playing in the Macedonian First Basketball League. He started his basketball career in KK Vardar. In 2007 he signed with KK AMAK SP from Ohrid. In 2009 he won the Macedonian Basketball Cup with KK AMAK SP. Next year Stojanovski signed with PBC Lukoil Academic from Bulgaria. In the seasons 2010/11 and 2011/12 with PBC Lukoil Academic he won the Bulgarian Basketball League. In 2012 he returned to Macedonia, signing with MZT Skopje Aerodrom. He was MVP on the Macedonian Cup Final in 2013 and MVP on the Macedonian basketball Final in 2014. On 8 December 2014, during a match against Levski Sofia he injured his left knee while trying to jump. He was immediately helped off the court. An MRI later revealed that Damjan tore the ACL in his knee and would miss the rest of the season. Damjan returned to full contact practice in August 2015. In the meantime, he re-signed with MZT Skopje for another season, and as captain he led the team for another title, fifth in a row for MZT, and fourth in a row with him as a part of the team. On 3 September 2016, he got injured again during a EuroBasket 2017 qualifiers in the match between Macedonia and Great Britain. On 15 June 2017, he re-signed with MZT Skopje. In July 2018, he re-signed with MZT Skopje for two years.

== National team ==
Damjan Stojanovski is a regular member of the Macedonian national basketball team. In 2009 he competed with the Macedonian team at the Eurobasket 2009 in Poland when Macedonian national basketball team finished 9th. In 2011 Stojanovski played on the Eurobasket 2011 in Lithuania and he helped his team to reach the 4th place, the best ever performance for the Macedonian national basketball team.

== Career statistics ==
Legend
GP	Games played	GS	Games started	MPG	Minutes per game
FG%	Field-goal percentage	3P%	3-point field-goal percentage	FT%	Free-throw percentage
RPG	Rebounds per game	APG	Assists per game	SPG	Steals per game
BPG	Blocks per game	PPG	Points per game	PIR	Performance index rating
**Bold**	Career high

=== Eurocup ===
Year	Team	GP	GS	MPG	FG%	3P%	FT%	RPG	APG	SPG	BPG	PPG	PIR
2011–12	Lukoil Academic	5	0	14.8	.348	.273	.765	2.2	0.2	1.0	0.0	6.4	6.2
2013–14	MZT Skopje Aerodrom	7	6	24.9	.449	.455	.750	3.3	1.9	0.6	0.3	8.6	8.3

=== Domestic leagues ===
Season	Team	League	GP	MPG	FG%	3P%	FT%	RPG	APG	SPG	BPG	PPG
2012–13	MZT Skopje	ABA League	26	29.1	.403	.302	.835	4.1	1.9	1.6	0.3	11.8
2013–14	MZT Skopje	ABA League	23	24.0	.399	.286	.772	2.7	1.4	0.7	0.1	9.0
2014–15	MZT Skopje	ABA League	5	33.4	.352	.304	.769	2.0	1.6	1.4	0.0	11.0
2015–16	MZT Skopje	ABA League	26	29.8	.390	.389	.827	2.7	1.6	0.9	0.2	10.5
2017–18	MZT Skopje	ABA League	22	49.5	.390	.387	.814	2.7	2.7	0.8	0.4	11.5
