= KK Žito Vardar =

Žito Vardar
- Founded: 1954
- Dissolved: 2003
- Location: Veles, North Macedonia
- Team colors: red and White
- Championships: 0
Home	Away

Žito Vardar is a defunct basketball club based in Veles, North Macedonia. They played in the Macedonian First League until the season 2003/2004.

== Domestic Achievements ==
- Macedonian League Finalist - 1997

== Notable former players ==
- (North Macedonia) Dime Tasovski
- (North Macedonia) Srdjan Stanković
- (North Macedonia) Risto Duganov
- (North Macedonia) Nikolče Petrušev
- (North Macedonia) Aleksandar Dimitrovski
- (North Macedonia) Zoran Nikolov
- (North Macedonia) Marjan Srbinovski
- (North Macedonia) Darko Zdravkovski
- (North Macedonia) Goran Veselinovski
- (North Macedonia) Ivica Blagojević
- (North Macedonia) Goce Andrevski
- (North Macedonia) Goce Gerasimovski
- (North Macedonia) Slobodan Petrovski
- (North Macedonia) Vlatko Nedelkov
- (North Macedonia) Zoran Majstorski
- (United States) Scotty Thurman
- (United States) Steven Edwards
- (United States) Micah Aaron Bell
- (United States) Ayinde Avery
- (United States) Jerod Haase
- (United States) Norman Dean Brown
- (United States) Thomas Jerome Rivers
- (Latvia) Igors Miglinieks
- (North Macedonia) Ordančo Madzurkarov
