= Ognen Stojanovski =

Macedonian basketball player

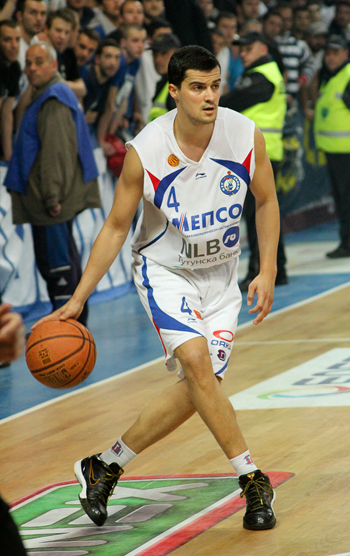
- Stojanovski with MZT in 2011

Personal information
- Born: January 25, 1984 (age 42) Skopje, SR Macedonia, SFR Yugoslavia
- Listed height: 1.91 m (6 ft 3 in)
- Listed weight: 80 kg (176 lb)

Career information
- Playing career: 2001–2014
- Position: Point guard

Career history
- 2001–2002: Rabotnički 2000
- 2002–2009: Rabotnički
- 2009–2011: Feni Industries
- 2011–2014: MZT Skopje

Career highlights
- 10× Macedonian First League champion (2003–2006, 2009–2014); 8× Macedonian Basketball Cup winner (2003–2006, 2010, 2012–2014)

Ognen Stojanovski (Macedonian: Огнен Стојановски; born January 25, 1984) is a former Macedonian professional basketball player. He was under contract with MZT Skopje until 2014. He is 1.91 m (6 ft 3 in) in height and plays at the point guard position.

Born in Skopje, Republic of Macedonia, he is older brother of the twins Vojdan Stojanovski and Damjan Stojanovski, who are also basketball players.

== Achievements ==
- (North Macedonia) Rabotnički
  - Macedonian League Champion - 2003, 2004, 2005, 2006, 2009
    - Macedonian Cup Winner - 2003, 2004, 2005, 2006
- (North Macedonia) Feni Industries
  - Macedonian League Champion - 2010, 2011
    - Macedonian Cup Winner - 2010
- (North Macedonia) MZT Skopje
  - Macedonian League Champion - 2012, 2013, 2014
    - Macedonian Cup Winner - 2012, 2013, 2014
