= Vojdan Stojanovski =

Macedonian professional basketball player

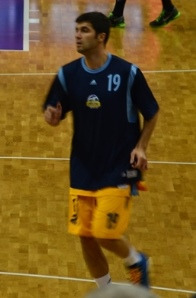
- with Alba Berlin

No. 20 – MZT Skopje
- Position: Shooting guard
- League: Macedonian League; ABA League

Personal information
- Born: December 9, 1987 (age 38) Skopje, SR Macedonia, SFR Yugoslavia
- Listed height: 1.95 m (6 ft 5 in)
- Listed weight: 87 kg (192 lb)

Career information
- Playing career: 2005–present

Career history
- 2005–2007: Vardar
- 2007–2009: AMAK SP
- 2009–2010: Napredak Kruševac
- 2010–2011: Feni Industries
- 2011–2012: Cherkaski Mavpy
- 2012–2013: Donetsk
- 2013–2015: Alba Berlin
- 2015–2016: MoraBanc Andorra
- 2016–2017: Real Betis Energía Plus
- 2017–2018: Büyükçekmece
- 2018–2019: EWE Baskets Oldenburg
- 2019–2020: Pau-Lacq-Orthez
- 2020–2021: BCM Gravelines-Dunkerque
- 2022–present: MZT Skopje

Career highlights
- 4× Best Macedonian basketball player (2009, 2011, 2015, 2023); 6× Macedonian Cup winner (2007, 2009, 2023–2026); 6x Macedonian League champion (2011, 2022–2026); 4× Macedonian Super Cup; 3× Macedonian League MVP (2011, 2023, 2026); Macedonian Cup MVP (2023); EUROHOLD Balkan League champion (2011); Ukrainian League champion (2012); German Basketball Cup winner (2014); 2× BBL Champions Cup winner (2013, 2014)

Vojdan Stojanovski (Macedonian: Војдан Стојановски; born December 9, 1987) is a Macedonian professional basketball player who currently plays for MZT Skopje of the Macedonian League. He is (1.95 m) in height and plays at the shooting guard position. He is the twin brother of Damjan Stojanovski and the younger brother of former basketball player Ognen Stojanovski.

== Pro career ==
Vojdan Stojanovski has played with: KK Vardar Skopje, KK AMAK SP, KK Napredak and KK Feni Industries.

On January 30, 2015, he signed with MoraBanc Andorra of the Liga ACB. On June 10, 2015, he extended his contract with Andorra for two more years.

On June 25, 2017, he signed with Turkish club Büyükçekmece Basketbol.

On July 24, 2018, he signed with EWE Oldenburg

On January 13, 2020, he has signed with BCM Gravelines-Dunkerque of the French LNB Pro A.

On January 31, 2022, Stojanovski signed with MZT Skopje of the Macedonian League.

== Achievements ==
- KK AMAK SP
  - Macedonian Cup Winner - 2009
- KK Feni Industries
  - Macedonian League Champion - 2011
  - EUROHOLD Balkan League Champion - 2011
- BC Donetsk
  - Ukrainian League Champion - 2012
- Alba Berlin
  - German Cup: 2014

== National team ==
Vojdan Stojanovski is a member of the Macedonian national basketball team. Vojdan helped his team reach the semi-finals of EuroBasket 2011 defeating Lithuania. During quarter-final game against the host, he scored five 3 point shots earning him 15 points and a clean sheet for the game. He has been lauded for his defensive skills during the tournament, earning him a place among the best ball stealers at the Eurobasket 2011.

== Career statistics ==
Legend
GP	Games played	GS	Games started	MPG	Minutes per game
FG%	Field-goal percentage	3P%	3-point field-goal percentage	FT%	Free-throw percentage
RPG	Rebounds per game	APG	Assists per game	SPG	Steals per game
BPG	Blocks per game	PPG	Points per game	PIR	Performance index rating
**Bold**	Career high

=== Euroleague ===
Year	Team	GP	GS	MPG	FG%	3P%	FT%	RPG	APG	SPG	BPG	PPG	PIR
2014–15	Alba Berlin	11	0	13.1	.378	.368	.750	1.2	1.2	0.5	0.0	4.3	3.4
Career		11	0	13.1	.378	.368	.750	1.2	1.2	0.5	0.0	4.3	3.4

=== Eurocup ===
Year	Team	GP	GS	MPG	FG%	3P%	FT%	RPG	APG	SPG	BPG	PPG	PIR
2011–12	Donetsk	7	0	17.4	.519	.333	.800	1.0	0.9	1.1	0.0	6.7	6.1
2012–13	Donetsk	6	3	29.8	.442	.333	.933	2.5	2.2	1.2	0.2	11.3	10.8
2013–14	Alba Berlin	20	0	19.9	.472	.313	.882	2.7	1.2	0.5	0.1	9.8	9.3
