= Zlatko Gocevski =

Macedonian basketball player

Free agent
- Position: Power forward

Personal information
- Born: April 9, 1982 (age 44) Vinica, SR Macedonia, Yugoslavia
- Listed height: 2.05 m (6 ft 9 in)
- Listed weight: 205 lb (93 kg)

Career information
- Playing career: 2000–present

Career history
- 2000–2003: MZT Skopje Aerodrom
- 2003–2005: Vardar
- 2005: Keflavík
- 2006: KB Peja
- 2006–2007: Strumica 2005
- 2007–2009: Feni Industries
- 2009–2010: BC Yambol
- 2010: Rabotnički
- 2011: MZT Skopje Aerodrom
- 2011: BC Yambol
- 2012: Feni Industries
- 2012–2013: Strumica
- 2013–2015: Kožuv
- 2015–2016: Strumica
- 2016: Kožuv
- 2017: Radoviš
- 2017: Blokotehna

Zlatko Gocevski (born April 9, 1982) is a Macedonian professional basketball power forward who last played for Blokotehna.
