= Predrag Joksimović =

Serbian basketball player

Personal information
- Born: March 3, 1977 (age 49) Belgrade, SR Serbia, SFR Yugoslavia
- Listed height: 2.00 m (6 ft 7 in)

Career information
- Playing career: 1997–2007
- Position: Shooting guard / small forward

Career history
- 1997–1998: Mašinac
- 1998–1999: Sloga Kraljevo
- 1999–2001: BKK Radnički
- 2001–2002: Spartak Subotica
- 2002–2003: OKK Beograd
- 2003: Nemetali Ogražden
- 2003–2004: Lusitânia
- 2004: G.S. Olympia Larissa B.C.
- 2004–2005: Fenstherm-Egri FS Fekete
- 2005: G.S. Olympia Larissa B.C.
- 2006–2007: Szolnoki Olaj KK
- 2006–2007: Rabotnički

Predrag Joksimović (born March 3, 1977) is a former Serbian professional basketball player who last played for Rabotnički.
