= Dime Tasovski =

Macedonian basketball player (born 1980)

Personal information
- Born: November 2, 1980 (age 46) Titov Veles, SR Macedonia, SFR Yugoslavia
- Listed height: 1.94 m (6 ft 4 in)
- Listed weight: 20 kg (44 lb)

Career information
- Playing career: 1998–2021
- Position: Small forward / power forward

Career history
- 1998–2003: Žito Vardar
- 2003: Vardar
- 2004–2007: Rabotnički
- 2007–2008: Strumica 2005
- 2008–2009: Rabotnički
- 2009: Politekhnika-Halychyna
- 2010: Trepça
- 2010–2011: Feni Industries
- 2011: Rabotnički
- 2012–2014: Liria
- 2014–2015: Karpoš Sokoli
- 2015–2016: Strumica
- 2016–2017: Rabotnički
- 2017–2021: Gostivar

Career highlights
- 5x Macedonian League champion (2005), (2006), (2007), (2009), (2011); 2x Macedonian League MVP (2006), (2009); 1x Macedonian Cup (2005); 1x Macedonian Basketball Super Cup (2007)

Dime Tasovski (born November 2, 1980) is a former Macedonian professional basketball small forward player.
