= Miljan Pupović =

Serbian basketball player

Personal information
- Born: February 4, 1983 (age 43) Zagreb, SR Croatia, SFR Yugoslavia
- Listed height: 2.10 m (6 ft 11 in)
- Listed weight: 107 kg (236 lb)

Career information
- NBA draft: 2005: undrafted
- Playing career: 1999–2017
- Position: Center

Career history
- 1999–2001: Beobanka / NIS Vojvodina
- 2001–2003: Hemofarm
- 2003–2005: Lavovi 063
- 2005: Hemofarm
- 2006: FMP
- 2006–2007: Igokea
- 2007–2008: Strumica 2005
- 2008–2009: Cherkaski Mavpy
- 2009–2010: Leuven Bears
- 2010: Superfund
- 2010: SC Kryvbas
- 2011: MZT Skopje
- 2011–2012: Cherkaski Mavpy
- 2012–2013: Steaua
- 2013–2014: Cherno More
- 2014: Levski Sofia
- 2014–2015: Cherno More
- 2015: BC Yambol
- 2015–2016: Sanat Naft Abadan BC
- 2016–2017: OKK Spars Sarajevo

Career highlights
- Adriatic League champion (2006); Bosnian Cup winner (2007); Bulgarian Cup winner (2015)

Miljan Pupović (born February 4, 1983) is a Serbian former professional basketball player.
