= Risto Duganov =

Macedonian basketball player

Personal information
- Born: May 19, 1975 (age 51) Macedonia
- Listed height: 1.98 m (6 ft 6 in)
- Listed weight: 94 kg (207 lb)
- Position: Small forward

Career history
- 1994–2000: Žito Vardar
- 1999–2000: Nemetali Ogražden
- 2001: Kumanovo
- 2001–2003: Balkan Steel
- 2003–2004: Nemetali Ogražden
- 2004–2005: FON University
- 2005–2006: Crn Drim

Risto Duganov (born May 19, 1975) is a former Macedonian professional basketball Small forward who played for Žito Vardar, Nemetali Ogražden, Kumanovo and Crn Drim.
