= Aleksandar Dimitrovski =

Macedonian basketball player

Personal information
- Born: 8 June 1980 (age 46) Gevgelija, SR Macedonia, SFR Yugoslavia
- Listed height: 1.93 m (6 ft 4 in)
- Listed weight: 87 kg (192 lb)

Career information
- Playing career: 2000–2013
- Position: Shooting guard / small forward

Career history
- 2000–2002: Žito Vardar
- 2002–2006: Rabotnički
- 2006–2007: Śląsk Wrocław
- 2007–2009: Feni Industries
- 2009–2011: Rabotnički
- 2011–2012: Kožuv
- 2012–2013: Rabotnički

Aleksandar "Mačka" Dimitrovski (Macedonian: Александар "Мачка" Димитровски; born 8 June 1980) is a former Macedonian professional basketball swingman who last played for Rabotnički. He was also member of North Macedonia national basketball team.

== Personal life ==
On 27 June 2015, Aleksandar married Macedonian pop singer Tamara Todevska. The couple part-ways after seven years of marriage.
