= Todor Gečevski =

Macedonian basketball player (born 1977)

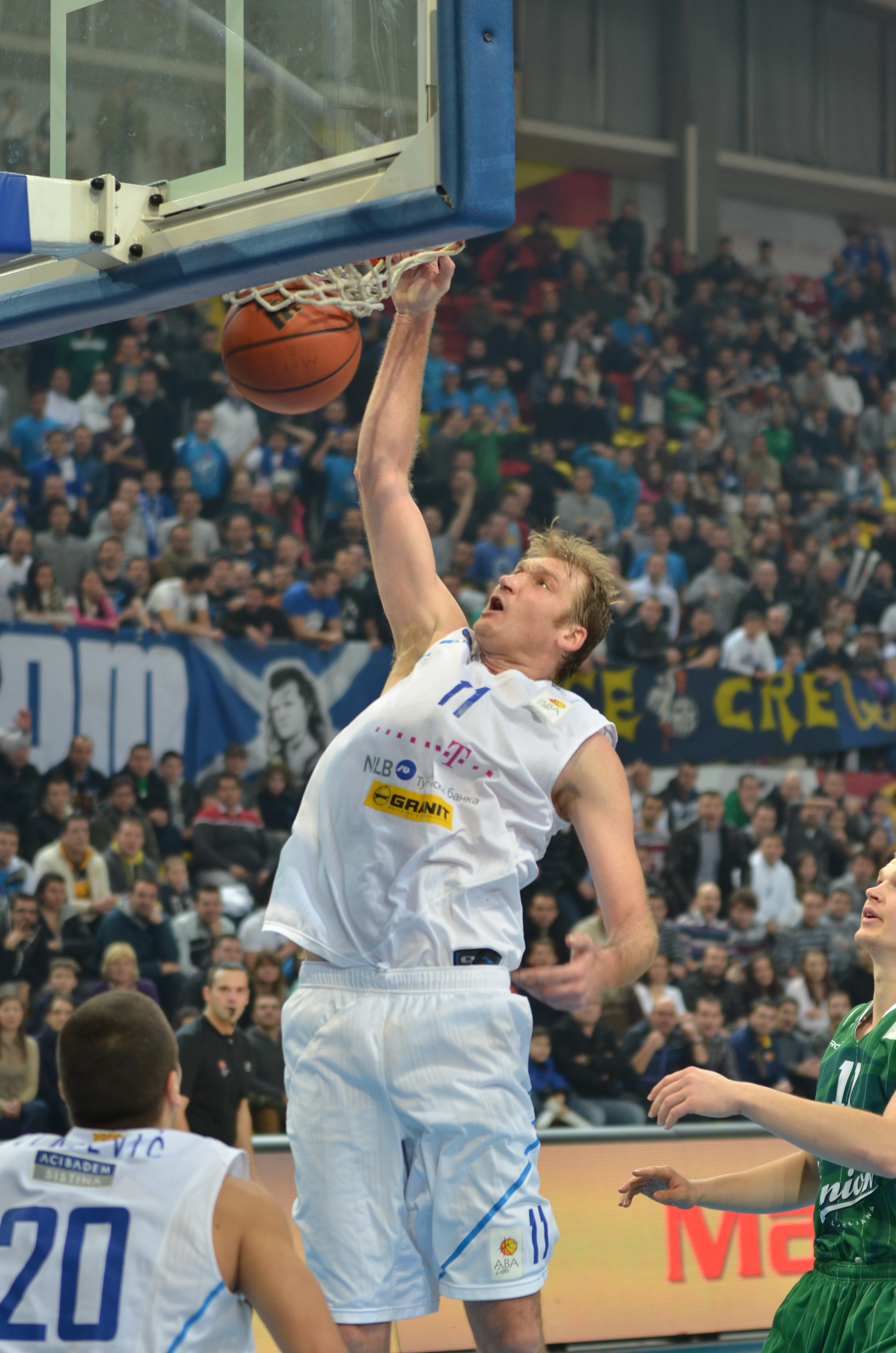
- Gečevski with MZT in 2013

Personal information
- Born: August 28, 1977 (age 49) Kavadarci, SR Macedonia, SFR Yugoslavia
- Listed height: 6 ft 10.75 in (2.10 m)
- Listed weight: 250 lb (113 kg)

Career information
- NBA draft: 1999: undrafted
- Playing career: 1993–2015
- Position: Center / power forward

Career history
- 1993–1999: Tikvesh
- 1999–2000: Nikol Fert
- 2001: MZT Skopje
- 2001–2002: Nikol Fert
- 2002–2003: Air Avellino
- 2003: BBV Hagen
- 2004: Rabotnički
- 2004–2009: Zadar
- 2009–2011: PAOK
- 2011–2014: MZT Skopje
- 2014–2015: Rabotnički

Career highlights
- All-EuroCup First Team (2009); Macedonian First League MVP (2012); 5× Macedonian League champion (2000, 2004, 2012–2014); 2× Croatian League champion (2005, 2008); 6× Macedonian Cup winner (2000, 2004, 2012–2015); 3× Croatian Cup winner (2005–2007); 2× Macedonian League MVP (2004, 2012); 4× Macedonian Cup MVP (2002, 2004, 2012, 2014); Most rebounds in Adriatic League of all time (1314); Highest index points in Adriatic League of all time (3212); Most games played (89) for the Macedonia national team

Todor Gečevski (Macedonian: Тодор Гечевски; born 28 August 1977) is a Macedonian former professional basketball player. Standing at a height of 2.10 m (6 ft 10 1/2 in), he played at the center and power forward positions.

== Professional career ==
While playing with KK Zadar, Gečevski was named to the All-EuroCup First Team in the 2008–09 season, being named the league's best center. He then signed with PAOK in Greece, and played there from 2009 to 2011. In 2011, he returned to Macedonia, and signed with MZT Skopje Aerodrom. In 2014, he joined Rabotnički.

== Macedonian national team ==
Gečevski was one of the most influential players of the Macedonia national basketball team in the past decade. He played at the 1995 FIBA Europe Under-16 Championship with Macedonia's junior national team. As a member of the senior Macedonian national team, he played at the EuroBasket 1999 and the EuroBasket 2009. He was considered a leader of the team at the EuroBasket 2011 in Lithuania, where he was crucial in the victories of the Macedonian national team against Croatia (78–76) and Greece (72–58), in the group stage. Despite carrying multiple injuries throughout the tournament, he participated until breaking both hands against Georgia. After that incident, he still wanted to play, even with fractures, which was an inspiration for his teammates, in their historic run to the semi-finals.

== Championships and cups as player ==
=== National domestic league championships ===
- 1999–2000: Nikol Fert: Macedonian League
- 2003–2004: Rabotnički: Macedonian League
- 2004–2005: Zadar: Croatian League
- 2007–2008: Zadar: Croatian League
- 2011–2012: MZT Skopje Aerodrom: Macedonian League
- 2012–2013: MZT Skopje Aerodrom: Macedonian League
- 2013–2014: MZT Skopje Aerodrom: Macedonian League

=== National domestic cup championships ===
- 1997–1998: Tikveš: Macedonian Cup (Finalist)
- 2001–2002: Nikol Fert: Macedonian Cup
- 2003–2004: Rabotnički: Macedonian Cup
- 2004–2005: Zadar: Croatian Cup
- 2005–2006: Zadar: Croatian Cup
- 2006–2007: Zadar: Croatian Cup
- 2011–2012: MZT Skopje Aerodrom: Macedonian Cup
- 2012–2013: MZT Skopje Aerodrom: Macedonian Cup
- 2013–2014: MZT Skopje Aerodrom: Macedonian Cup
- 2014–2015: Rabotnički: Macedonian Cup
