= Slobodan Mihajlovski =

Macedonian basketball player

Free agent
- Position: Power forward

Personal information
- Born: February 23, 1982 (age 44) Gostivar, Macedonia
- Listed height: 2.02 m (6 ft 8 in)
- Listed weight: 210 lb (95 kg)

Career history
- 2001–2002: Gostivar
- 2003–2004: Vardar
- 2004–2005: Mavrovo
- 2005–2006: Veles 2000
- 2006–2007: Vardar
- 2007–2012: Feni Industries
- 2012–2013: Rabotnički
- 2015–2018: AV Ohrid
- 2018: Gostivar
- 2019–2020: Crn Drim

Slobodan Mihajlovski (born February 23, 1982) is a Macedonian professional basketball Power forward.
