= KK AMAK SP =

KK AMAK SP
- Founded: 2005
- Dissolved: 2009
- History: KK AMAK SP (2005–2009)
- Arena: Biljanini Izvori hall
- Location: Ohrid, North Macedonia
- Championships: 1 Macedonian Cup
| Home | Away |

KK AMAK SP was a basketball club based in Ohrid, North Macedonia. AMAK SP participated in the Macedonian Premier League. Their home arena was the Biljanini Izvori hall.

== History ==
AMAK SP was formed in the year 2005 in the city of Ohrid by the AMAK SP a safety belts producing company. They have been playing the Second Macedonian League but as of the 2006 season they advanced to the Macedonian First League. In 2009, the club won its first major trophy by winning the Macedonian Basketball Cup.

== Honours ==
=== Domestic Achievements ===
- Macedonian Cup Winner - 2009

== Notable players ==
- (North Macedonia) Eftim Bogoev
- (North Macedonia) Vojdan Stojanovski
- (North Macedonia) Damjan Stojanovski
- (North Macedonia) Igor Penov
- (North Macedonia) Vlatko Nedelkov
- (North Macedonia) Angel Tasevski
- (North Macedonia) Igor Trajkovski
- (United States) Jarrid Frye
- (United States) Will Caudle
- (Serbia) Mirolsav Čubrilo
- (Serbia) Slaviša Bogavac
- (Serbia) Slobodan Agoč
- (Serbia) Ninoslav Tmušić
- (Bosnia and Herzegovina) Mladen Gambiroža
