= Jovica Arsić =

Serbian basketball coach

Enisey
- Position: Head coach

Personal information
- Born: November 3, 1968 (age 58) Leskovac, SR Serbia, SFR Yugoslavia
- Coaching career: 1999–present

Career history

Coaching
- 1999–2003: Zdravlje
- 2003–2004: Lavovi 063
- 2004–2005: NIS Vojvodina
- 2006–2007: Zdravlje
- 2007–2009: Macedonia
- 2007–2008: Strumica
- 2008–2009: Cherkaski Mavpy
- 2009–2011: Lukoil Academic
- 2012–2013: Cherkaski Mavpy
- 2014–2015: Lukoil Academic
- 2015–2016: BCM U Pitesti
- 2018–2019: Borac Čačak
- 2019–2021: Balkan
- 2021: Serbia (assistant coach)
- 2023–present: Enisey

Career highlights
- 3× Bulgarian League champion (2010, 2011, 2015); Bulgarian Cup winner (2011)
Medals
Men's basketball
Assistant Coach for FR Yugoslavia
FIBA EuroBasket
Gold medal – first place	2001 Turkey	Team

Jovica Arsić (Serbian: Јовица Арсић; November 3, 1968) is a Serbian professional basketball coach.

== Coaching career ==
On April 9, 2018, Arsić was named as the head coach for Borac Čačak. Borac parted ways with him in June 2019. On June 17, 2019, Arsić was named as the head coach for Balkan Botevgrad of the Bulgarian NBL.
