= Riste Stefanov =

Macedonian basketball player

Personal information
- Born: August 30, 1983 (age 43) Kavadarci, SR Macedonia, SFR Yugoslavia
- Listed height: 6 ft 6.5 in (1.99 m)
- Listed weight: 190 lb (86 kg)

Career information
- Playing career: 1998–2014
- Position: Shooting guard

Career history
- 1998–2000: Tikveš
- 2000–2001: MZT Skopje
- 2001: Union Olimpija
- 2001–2002: Balkan Steel
- 2002–2003: Beşiktaş
- 2003–2005: Rabotnički
- 2005–2009: Lukoil Academic
- 2009–2010: AEK Athens
- 2010: Rabotnički
- 2010–2011: Basket Citta' Di San Severo
- 2011: MZT Skopje
- 2012: Ilysiakos B.C.
- 2014: Feni Industries
- 2014: Rabotnički

Riste Stefanov (born August 30, 1983) is a Macedonian former basketball player.

== Pro career ==
Stefanov began his career with KK Tikveš's juniors. He made his debut with KK Tikveš during the 1999–00 season and was signed for the 2000–01 season by KK MZT Skopje. He moved to Slovenia for the 2001–02 season, signed by KK Union Olimpija. In December 2001, he left the team and moved back to Macedonia, signed by Balkan Steel Skopje. He moved to Turkey for the 2002–03 season, signed by Beşiktaş and returned to Macedonia in January 2003, signed by KK Rabotnički. Played there also the 2004–05 championship. Moved to Bulgaria for the 2005–06 season, signed by PBC Academic Sofia. Then played in Greek A1 with AEK. In addition to Macedonian, Stefanov also holds Bulgarian citizenship.
