= KK Millenium Strumica =

Strumica 2005
- Founded: 1991
- Dissolved: 2008
- History: Makedonija 91; 1991–2000; Polo Trejd; 2001–2005; Strumica 2005; 2005–2008
- Arena: Sports Hall Park (capacity: 4,000)
- Location: Strumica, North Macedonia
- Team colors: Green and white
- Championships: 1 Championships of Macedonia; 1 Macedonian Super Cups
Home	Away

KK Millenium Strumica (Macedonian: Струмица 2005; also known previously as KK Strumica 2005) was a Macedonian basketball club based in Strumica. It was founded in 1991 under the name Makedonija '91, and was later also known as Polo Trejd. After a change in leadership in 2005, the club became known as Strumica 2005 and new president, Pajanotis Karapiperis, formed a strong culture by bringing in significant players to the team. They become champions of the Macedonian First League in the 2006–07 season and were Macedonian Cup finalists in 2007 and 2008. However, following the 2007–08 season, the club canceled its participation in the First League and the newly formed Balkan League due to financial concerns. They continued to play in the Second League until 2012, where after winning the 2011–12 championship, they folded completely and merged with ABA Strumica.

== Roster season 2007/2008 ==
KK Millenium Strumica roster
Players
Coaches

Pos.	No.	Nat.	Name	Ht.		Age
G	4	(North Macedonia)	Bogoev, Eftim	1.86 m (6 ft 1 in)	80 kg (176 lb)	44 – 2 November 1980
GG	5	(North Macedonia)	Cvetkov, Petre	1.90 m (6 ft 3 in)	77 kg (170 lb)	40 – 13 December 1984
SG	6	(North Macedonia)	Sokolov, Darko	1.90 m (6 ft 3 in)	86 kg (190 lb)	38 – 8 May 1986
C	7	(Croatia)	Delić, Nenad	2.09 m (6 ft 10 in)	87 kg (192 lb)	40 – 22 April 1984
SF	8	(North Macedonia)	Tasovski, Dime	2.01 m (6 ft 7 in)		44 – 2 November 1980
PG	9	(North Macedonia)	Grnčarov, Toni	1.90 m (6 ft 3 in)	80 kg (176 lb)	45 – 8 February 1980
F	10	(North Macedonia)	Krstevski, Viktor	1.99 m (6 ft 6 in)	85 kg (187 lb)	45 – 28 July 1979
F	11	(Serbia)	Bošnjak, Ivan	1.95 m (6 ft 5 in)	80 kg (176 lb)	42 – 17 May 1982
PF	12	(Serbia)	Pupović, Miljan	2.10 m (6 ft 11 in)	80 kg (176 lb)	42 – 4 February 1983
PF	13	(North Macedonia)	Sokolov, Tomčo	2.05 m (6 ft 9 in)	97 kg (214 lb)	41 – 1 March 1984
C	14	(Serbia)	Latović, Damir	2.04 m (6 ft 8 in)	110 kg (243 lb)	44 – 10 July 1980

Head coach

- (Serbia) Jovica Arsić

Assistant coach(es)

- (North Macedonia)

Legend

- (C) Team captain
- Injured

- Roster
Updated: 2016-01-27

=== Depth chart ===
Pos.	Starting 5	Bench 1	Bench 2
C	Damir Latović	Nenad Delić
PF	Miljan Pupović	Tomčo Sokolov
SF	Dime Tasovski	Ivan Bošnjak	Viktor Krstevski
SG	Darko Sokolov	Petre Cvetkov
PG	Toni Grnčarov	Eftim Bogoev

== Strumica in FIBA competitions ==
1993 Radivoj Korać Cup

Round	Team	Home	Away
1.Round	(Ukraine) TIIT Kharkov	97–75	103–68

1997 Eurocup

Round	Team	Home	Away
Group stage	(Romania) CS Dinamo București	105–97	88–72
Group stage	(Turkey) Darüşşafaka S.K.	70–87	92–61
Group stage	(Montenegro) Budućnost Podgorica	71–90	97–70
Group stage	(Italy) Pallacanestro Trieste	98–82	107–76

2007 Eurocup

Round	Team	Home	Away
Qualifying round	(Croatia) Cedevita	75–69	76–72
Qualifying round	(Russia) PBC Lokomotiv Rostov	57–67	87–69

== Notable past players ==
- (North Macedonia) Zlatko Gocevski
- (North Macedonia) Dime Tasovski
- (North Macedonia) Darko Sokolov
- (North Macedonia) Eftim Bogoev
- (North Macedonia) Viktor Krstevski
- (North Macedonia) Toni Grnčarov
- (North Macedonia) Tomčo Sokolov
- (North Macedonia) Dimče Gaštarski
- (North Macedonia) Slobodančo Hadživasilev
- (Greece) Vassilis Kitsoulis
- (Greece) Vasslis Tsimpliaridis
- (Greece) Savvas Manousos
- (Serbia) Miljan Pupović
- (Serbia) Damir Latović
- (Serbia) Ivan Bošnjak
- (Serbia) Njegoš Abazović
- (Croatia) Nenad Delić
- (United States) Wesley Fluellen
