= Toni Simić =

Macedonian basketball player (born 1976)

Toni Simic
Personal information
- Born: June 8, 1976 (age 50) Skopje, SR Macedonia, SFR Yugoslavia
- Listed height: 2.10 m (6 ft 11 in)

Career information
- Playing career: 1993–2016
- Position: Center

Career history
- 1993–1998: MZT Skopje
- 1998–2005: Rabotnički
- 2005: SKK Kotwica Kołobrzeg
- 2005–2009: Rabotnički
- 2009–2010: Vardar Osiguruvanje
- 2010: Torus
- 2010–2011: Rabotnički
- 2011–2014: Lirija
- 2014–2015: Feni Industries
- 2015–2016: Gostivar

Toni Simić (born June 8, 1976) is a Macedonian former professional basketball player who last played for Gostivar. He was also member of Macedonian national basketball team.

His son Teodor Simić is also a basketball player. He is a member of Kožuv.
