= Goran Samardziev =

Macedonian basketball player

Personal information
- Born: May 24, 1981 (age 45) Kavadarci, SR Macedonia, SFR Yugoslavia
- Listed height: 1.87 m (6 ft 2 in)

Career information
- Playing career: 1997–2016
- Position: Head coach
- Coaching career: 2016–present

Career history

Playing
- 1997–1999: Orka
- 2000–2006: Rabotnički
- 2006–2007: Vardar
- 2007–2013: Feni Industries
- 2013–2014: Lirija
- 2014–2016: Feni Industri

Coaching
- 2016–2019: Feni Industries (ass.coach)
- 2019–2023: Feni Industries
- 2023–2025: Rabotnički
- 2025–2026: Macedonia U-20
- 2026-present: Rahoveci 029

Goran Samardziev (born May 24, 1981) is a Macedonian former professional basketball player who is currently coach. He used to play for Feni Industri, Rabotnički, Vardar and Lirija. He is known for his agility, playmaking and three-point shooting.

On October 30, 2023, he became a coach of his former basketball club Rabotnički.
