= Macedonian First League (basketball) =

- Founded: 1992
- Country: North Macedonia
- Confederation: FIBA Europe
- Number of teams: 10
- Level on pyramid: 1
- Domestic cup: Macedonian Cup
- Current champions: MZT Skopje (13th title)
- Most championships: Rabotnički (15 titles)
- CEO: Tomica Glavčev
- TV partners: MRT
- Website: mkf.mk

The Macedonian First League (Macedonian: Македонска прва лига, Makedonska prva liga) is the top-tier basketball competition in the Republic of North Macedonia organized by the Basketball Federation of North Macedonia. Until 1992 it was called Macedonian Republic League after which it was transformed into top division level Macedonian Basketball First League. After the transformation, teams from the dissolved Yugoslav Federal Leagues (MZT Skopje and Rabotnički) joined the Macedonian First League.

== Teams ==
Location of teams in the 2025–26 Macedonian First League

Team	Home City	Arena	Colour	Coach
Tikvesh	Kavadarci	Jasmin		
Kožuv	Gevgelija	26-ti April		
MKK Kumanovo	Kumanovo	Sports Hall Kumanovo		
MZT Skopje Aerodrom	Skopje	Jane Sandanski Arena		
Pelister	Bitola	Sports Hall Mladost		
Rabotnički	Skopje	Gradski Park		
TFT	Skopje	Forza Sport Center		
Sokoli 1933 Štip	Štip	Jackson Arena		
Madzari	Skopje	Naum Naumovski Borče		
Strumica	Strumica	Sala Park		

== Champions ==
Season	Champions	Score	Runner-up	MVP
1992–93	Godel Rabotnički	3–2 (five game series)	MZT Skopje Hepos	
1993–94	Godel Rabotnički	3–2 (five game series)	Kočani Delikates	
1994–95	Godel Rabotnički	3–2 (five game series)	Kočani Delikates	
1995–96	Godel Rabotnički	3–0 (five game series)	MZT Skopje	
1996–97	Godel Rabotnički	4–1 (seven game series)	Žito Vardar	
1997–98	Godel Rabotnički	3–2 (five game series)	MZT Boss Skopje	
1998–99	Godel Rabotnički	3–2 (five game series)	MZT Boss Skopje	
1999–00	Nikol Fert	3–2 (five game series)	Godel Rabotnički	
2000–01	Rabotnički	3–0 (five game series)	MZT Skopje 2000	(North Macedonia) Gjorgji Čekovski (1)
2001–02	Feršped Rabotnički	4–2 (seven game series)	Kumanovo	(North Macedonia) Gjorgji Čekovski (2)
2002–03	Feršped Rabotnički	4–0 (seven game series)	KK Polo Trejd Strumica	(North Macedonia) Aleksandar Dimitrovski
2003–04	Feršped Rabotnički	4–1 (seven game series)	MZT Skopje 2000	(North Macedonia) Todor Gečevski (1)
2004–05	Feršped Rabotnički	4–2 (seven game series)	Vardar Osiguruvanje	(North Macedonia) Toni Simić
2005–06	Feršped Rabotnički	4–1 (seven game series)	Vardar Osiguruvanje	(North Macedonia) Dime Tasovski (1)
2006–07	Strumica 2005	4–1 (seven game series)	Feršped Rabotnički	(North Macedonia) Zlatko Gocevski
2007–08	Feni Industries	4–3 (seven game series)	Strumica 2005	(United States) Donald Cole
2008–09	Rabotnički	4–2 (seven game series)	Feni Industries	(North Macedonia) Dime Tasovski (2)
2009–10	Feni Industries	4–3 (seven game series)	Vardar Osiguruvanje	(North Macedonia) Damjan Stojanovski (1)
2010–11	Feni Industries	4–1 (seven game series)	Rabotnički	(North Macedonia) Vojdan Stojanovski
2011–12	MZT Skopje Aerodrom	4–1 (seven game series)	Feni Industries	(North Macedonia) Todor Gečevski (2)
2012–13	MZT Skopje Aerodrom	4–0 (seven game series)	Kozuv	(North Macedonia) Gjorgji Čekovski (3)
2013–14	MZT Skopje Aerodrom	3–1 (five game series)	Rabotnički	(North Macedonia) Damjan Stojanovski (2)
2014–15	MZT Skopje Aerodrom	3–0 (five game series)	Kumanovo	(North Macedonia) Marko Simonovski – (Montenegro) Sead Šehović
2015–16	MZT Skopje Aerodrom	3–1 (five game series)	Kumanovo	(North Macedonia) Damjan Stojanovski (3)
2016–17	MZT Skopje Aerodrom	3–2 (five game series)	Karpoš Sokoli	(Netherlands) Charlon Kloof
2017–18	Rabotnički	3–0 (five game series)	MZT Skopje Aerodrom	(United States) Russell Robinson
2018–19	MZT Skopje Aerodrom	3–0 (five game series)	Rabotnički	(North Macedonia) Damjan Stojanovski (4)
2019–20	MZT Skopje Aerodrom finished 1st / Play Off cancelled due covid-19			
2020–21	MZT Skopje Aerodrom	3–0 (five game series)	EuroNickel 2005	(North Macedonia) Andrej Magdevski
2021–22	MZT Skopje Aerodrom	3–1 (five game series)	Pelister	(Montenegro) Nemanja Milošević
2022–23	MZT Skopje Aerodrom	3–0 (five game series)	Pelister	(North Macedonia) Vojdan Stojanovski (2)
2023–24	MZT Skopje Aerodrom	3–0 (five game series)	Pelister	(North Macedonia) Damjan Stojanovski (5)
2024-25	MZT Skopje Aerodrom	3–1 (five game series)	TFT	(United States Virgin Islands) Deon Edwin
2025–26	MZT Skopje Aerodrom	3–0 (five game series)	Madzari	(North Macedonia) Vojdan Stojanovski (3)

== Performance by club ==
Club	Winner	Year	Runner up	Year
Rabotnički	15	1993, 1994, 1995, 1996, 1997, 1998, 1999, 2001, 2002, 2003, 2004, 2005, 2006, 2009, 2018	5	2000, 2007, 2011, 2014, 2019
MZT Skopje Aerodrom	14	2012, 2013, 2014, 2015, 2016, 2017, 2019, 2020, 2021, 2022, 2023, 2024, 2025, 2026	7	1993, 1996, 1998, 1999, 2001, 2004, 2018
Feni Industries	3	2008, 2010, 2011	2	2009, 2012
Strumica 2005	1	2007	2	2003, 2008
Nikol Fert Gostivar	1	2000	/	/
Kumanovo	/	/	3	2002, 2015, 2016
Vardar	/	/	2	2005, 2006
Kočani Delikates	/	/	2	1994, 1995
Pelister	/	/	3	2022, 2023, 2024
Karpoš Sokoli	/	/	1	2017
Kožuv	/	/	1	2013
Vardar Osiguruvanje	/	/	1	2010
Žito Vardar	/	/	1	1997

== Records and statistics ==
=== Head coaches with two or more titles ===
Titles	Head coach	Seasons
7	Marin Dokuzovski	1995, 1996, 1998, 1999, 2004, 2009, 2018
4	Vasko Atanasov	2023, 2024, 2025, 2026
3	Steruli Andonovski	2001, 2002, 2004
3	Emil Rajković	2008, 2010, 2011
2	Aleksandar Knjazev	1993, 1994
2	Jordančo Davitkov	2005, 2006
2	Aleš Pipan	2013, 2015

=== Players with three or more titles ===
Note: This table is incomplete

Titles	Player	Seasons
11	Damjan Stojanovski	2013, 2014, 2015, 2016, 2019, 2021, 2022, 2023, 2024, 2025, 2026
10	Ognen Stojanovski	2003, 2004, 2005, 2006, 2009, 2010, 2011, 2012, 2013, 2014
10	Marjan Gjurov	1999, 2001, 2002, 2003, 2004, 2005, 2006, 2008, 2010, 2011
9	Goran Veselinovski	1998, 1999, 2001, 2002, 2003, 2004, 2005, 2006, 2009
9	Goran Samardziev	2001, 2002, 2003, 2004, 2005, 2006, 2008, 2010, 2011
9	Gjorgji Čekovski	1998, 1999, 2001, 2002, 2003, 2012, 2013, 2014, 2018
8	Toni Simić	1999, 2001, 2002, 2003, 2004, 2005, 2006, 2009
7	Jordančo Davitkov	1993, 1994, 1995, 1996, 1997, 1998, 2000
7	Srdjan Stanković	1993, 1994, 1995, 1996, 1997, 1998, 2005
7	Bojan Krstevski	2018, 2021, 2022, 2023, 2024, 2025, 2026
7	Gjorgi Kočov	2001, 2002, 2003, 2004, 2005, 2006, 2012
6	Dejan Jovanovski	1993, 1994, 1995, 1996, 1997, 2006
6	Vojdan Stojanovski	2011, 2022, 2023, 2024, 2025, 2026
5	Gjorgje Vojnović	1994, 1995, 1996, 1997, 1998
5	Emil Rajković	1996, 1997, 1999, 2001, 2002
5	Kiril Pavlovski	2001, 2002, 2003, 2005, 2006
5	Aleksandar Dimitrovski	2003, 2004, 2005, 2008, 2009
5	Bojan Trajkovski	2004, 2005, 2006, 2009, 2010
5	Dime Tasovski	2004, 2005, 2006, 2009, 2011
5	Todor Gečevski	2000, 2004, 2012, 2013, 2014
5	Gorjan Markovski	2009, 2013, 2014, 2015, 2016
5	Ljubomir Mladenovski	2014, 2015, 2016, 2017, 2019
5	Adem Mekić	2015, 2016, 2017, 2021, 2022
4	Dušan Bocevski	1994, 1995, 1996, 1997
4	Pero Blazevski	1993, 1994, 1995, 1998
4	Kiril Nikolovski	2013, 2014, 2015, 2018
3	Riste Stefanov	2003, 2004, 2005
3	Dejan Vegov	2003, 2005, 2006
3	Slobodan Mihajlovski	2008, 2010, 2011
3	Toni Grnčarov	2007, 2009, 2012
3	Eftim Bogoev	2007, 2010, 2013
3	Darko Sokolov	2010, 2011, 2019
3	Marko Simonovski	2015, 2017, 2019
3	Damjan Robev	2022, 2023, 2024
