= Cup of Macedonia =

National basketball cup of North Macedonia

- Founded: 1993; 33 years ago
- First season: 1993
- Country: North Macedonia
- Confederation: FIBA Europe
- Number of teams: 12
- Current champions: MZT Skopje (14th title)
- Most championships: MZT Skopje (14 titles)
- Website: Official site

The Basketball Cup of Macedonia (Macedonian: Кошаркарски куп на Македонија), is an elimination basketball tournament held annually. It is the second most important national title in Macedonian basketball after the Macedonian First League. Currently, MZT Skopje holds the record for most titles won - 14.

== Past champions ==
Season	Host city	Champions	Runner-up	Result	MVP
1993	Kočani	Godel Rabotnički	Kočani Delikates	106–84	
1994	Gostivar	Godel Rabotnički	MZT Skopje	81–49	
1995	Skopje	Kočani Delikates	MZT Skopje	64–61	
1996	Skopje	MZT Skopje	Godel Rabotnički	69–64	(North Macedonia) Vlatko Vladičevski
1997	Radoviš	MZT Skopje	Tikveš Kavadarci	92–86	(North Macedonia) Toni Simić
1998	Kavadarci	Godel Rabotnički	Orka Kavadarci	80–78	(North Macedonia) Goran Dimitrijević
1999	Kavadarci	MZT Boss Skopje	Nikolfert Gostivar	78–73	(North Macedonia) Mirza Kurtović
2000	Skopje	MZT Boss Skopje	Rabotnički	68–66	(North Macedonia) Gjorgji Knjazev
2001	Ohrid	Nikolfert Gostivar	Feršped Rabotnički	72–65	(North Macedonia) Budimir Jolović
2002	Ohrid	Nikolfert Gostivar	Feršped Rabotnički	88–82	(North Macedonia) Todor Gečevski (1)
2003	Skopje	Feršped Rabotnički	MZT Skopje 2000	70–68	(North Macedonia) Gjorgji Čekovski (1)
2004	Skopje	Feršped Rabotnički	Nemetali Ogražden	87–73	(North Macedonia) Todor Gečevski (2)
2005	Skopje	Feršped Rabotnički	Vardar Osiguruvanje	73–71	(North Macedonia) Dime Tasovski
2006	Strumica	Feršped Rabotnički	Vardar Osiguruvanje	80–78	(North Macedonia) Ognen Stojanovski
2007	Bitola	Vardar Osiguruvanje	Strumica 2005	73–66	(Dominican Republic) Carlos Morban
2008	Kavadarci	Feni Industries	Strumica 2005	86–83	(North Macedonia) Goran Samardziev
2009	Ohrid	AMAK SP	Swisslion Pelister	77–60	(North Macedonia) Eftim Bogoev (1)
2010	Vinica	Feni Industries	Torus	81–67	(North Macedonia) Eftim Bogoev (2)
2011	Skopje	Rabotnički	MZT Skopje Aerodrom	74–69	(North Macedonia) Pero Blaževski
2012	Skopje	MZT Skopje Aerodrom	Feni Industries	84–66	(North Macedonia) Todor Gečevski (3)
2013	Skopje	MZT Skopje Aerodrom	Kumanovo	79–71	(North Macedonia) Damjan Stojanovski and Aleksandar Kostoski
2014	Ohrid	MZT Skopje Aerodrom	Lirija	76–73	(North Macedonia) Todor Gečevski (4)
2015	Skopje	Rabotnički	Kožuv	74–66	(North Macedonia) Gjorgji Čekovski (2)
2016	Gevgelija	MZT Skopje Aerodrom	Karpoš Sokoli	68–62	(Serbia) Marko Luković
2017	Kavadarci	Karpoš Sokoli	Feni Industries	80–69	(Croatia) Dominik Mavra
2018	Kavadarci	MZT Skopje Aerodrom	Rabotnički	76–67	(North Macedonia) Damjan Stojanovski (2)
2019	Gevgelija	Rabotnički	Blokotehna	85–71	(Bulgaria) Chavdar Kostov
2021	Skopje	MZT Skopje Aerodrom	Rabotnički	77–69	(North Macedonia) Damjan Stojanovski (3)
2022	Skopje	TFT	MZT Skopje Aerodrom	80–66	(United States) Amir Smith
2023	Skopje	MZT Skopje Aerodrom	Feniks 2010	89–73	(North Macedonia) Vojdan Stojanovski
2024	Bitola	MZT Skopje Aerodrom	Pelister	62–60	(North Macedonia) Damjan Robev
2025	Gevgelija	MZT Skopje Aerodrom	Kožuv	86–61	(North Macedonia) Andrej Maslinko
2026	Kumanovo	MZT Skopje Aerodrom	Kumanovo	96–70	(United States) Mack Smith-McEwen

== Performance by club ==
Club	Winners	Years winner	Runners-up	Years
MZT Skopje Aerodrom	14	1996, 1997, 1999, 2000, 2012, 2013, 2014, 2016, 2018, 2021, 2023, 2024, 2025, 2026	5	1994, 1995, 2003, 2011, 2022
Rabotnički	10	1993, 1994, 1998, 2003, 2004, 2005, 2006, 2011, 2015, 2019	6	1996, 2000, 2001, 2002, 2018, 2021
Feni Industries	2	2008, 2010	4	1997, 1998, 2012, 2017
Gostivar	2	2001, 2002	1	1999
Vardar	1	2007	2	2005, 2006
Kočani Delikates	1	1995	1	1993
Karpoš Sokoli	1	2017	1	2016
TFT	1	2022		
AMAK SP	1	2009		
Strumica			2	2007, 2008
Pelister			2	2009, 2024
Kožuv			2	2015, 2025
Kumanovo			2	2013, 2026
Nemetali Ogražden			1	2004
Torus			1	2010
Lirija			1	2014
Blokotehna			1	2019
Feniks 2010			1	2023
