= KK Strumica =

Basketball club in Strumica, North Macedonia

- Leagues: Macedonian League
- Founded: 1949; 76 years ago
- History: ABA Strumica; 2005–2014; KK Strumica; 2014–present
- Arena: Arena Park
- Capacity: 5,000
- Location: Strumica, North Macedonia
- President: Dragan Popovski
- Head coach: Vlasis Vlaikidis
Home	Away

KK Strumica is a basketball club based in Strumica, North Macedonia. They currently compete in the Macedonian First League.

== History ==
KK Strumica was founded in 1949.It played many seasons in Macedonian Basketball League.In year 1982 KK Strumica finally won the championship. They had many good seasons all the way till 1991.

- Team Makedonija '91 Strumica was founded in 1991 adding the name Makedonija, and was later also known as Polo Trejd Strumica. The club changed its name to ABA Strumica from 2005 to 2012.ABA Strumica merged with KK Millenium Strumica in season 2011-2012. After a change in leadership in 2005, a new president, Pajanotis Karapiperis, formed a strong culture by bringing in significant players to the team.
- Champions They become champions of the Macedonian First League in the 2006–07 season.They were Macedonian Cup finalists in 2007 and 2008. However, following the 2007–08 season, the club canceled its participation in the First League and the newly formed Balkan League due to financial concerns. They continued to play in the Second League until 2012, where after winning the 2011–12 championship, they folded completely and merged with ABA Strumica.
- KK Strumica is back .From year 2014 financial problems were fixed and behind. The city of Strumica became owner and main sponsor of the team. The team is back in the top flight Macedonian Basketball Championship .

== Home Ground ==
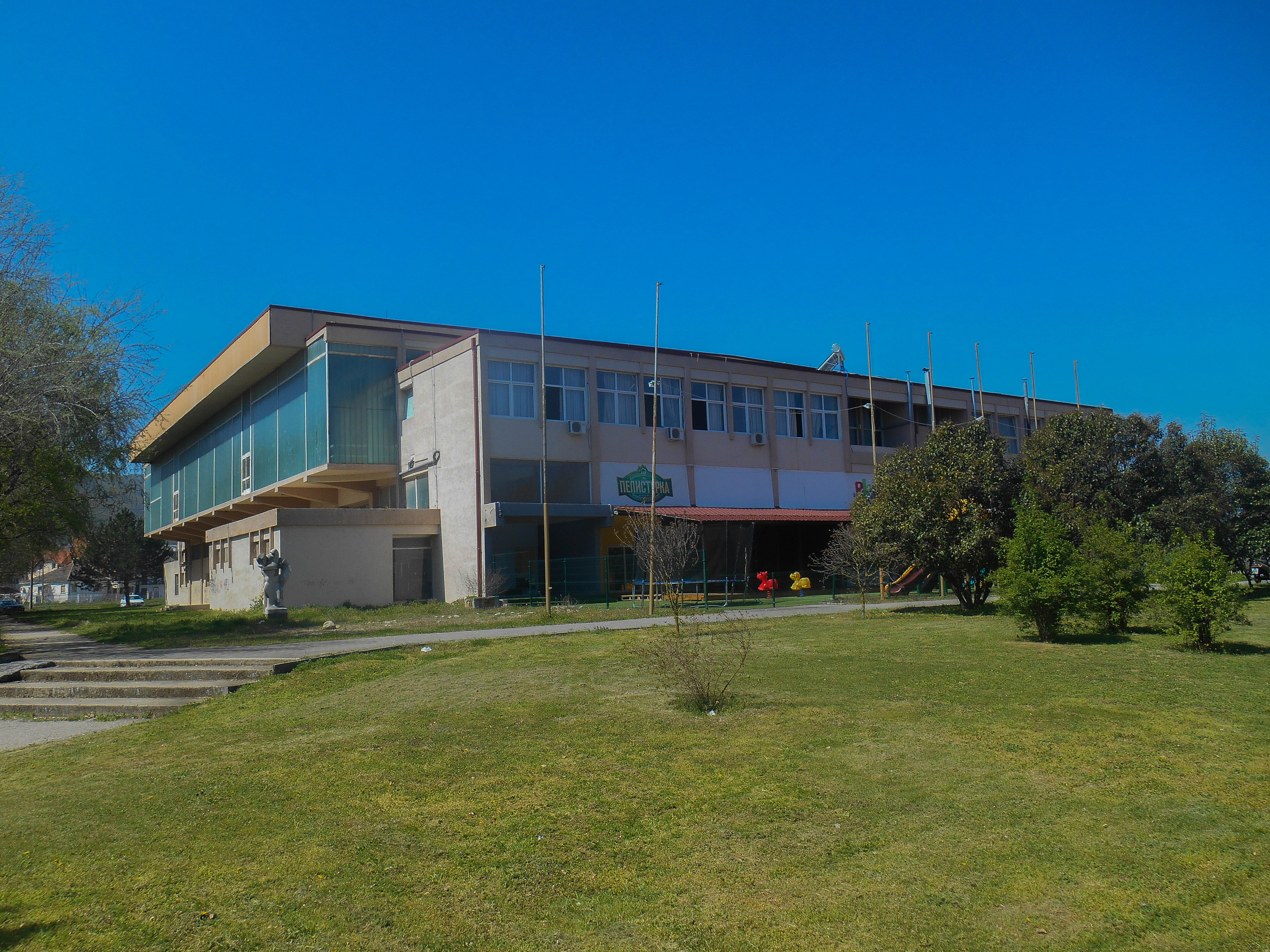
KK Strumica plays their basketball matches at Arena Park .Sports Hall with capacity of 5000.

== Champions (North Macedonia) ==
- (2) : 1982, 2007

Macedonian Basketball Super Cup

- :2007

== Current roster 2017/18 ==
KK Strumica roster
Players
Coaches

Pos.	No.	Nat.	Name	Ht.		Age
G	2	(United States)	Diehl, Tyler	1.93 m (6 ft 4 in)	79 kg (174 lb)	33 – 3 November 1991
PG	5	(North Macedonia)	Cvetkov, Petre (C)	1.85 m (6 ft 1 in)	72 kg (159 lb)	40 – 13 December 1984
	8	(North Macedonia)	Abrašev, Dragan			25 – 16 May 2000
	11	(North Macedonia)	Šajkarov, Aleksandar			31 – 19 October 1994
G	13	(North Macedonia)	Stojmenov, Damjan	1.85 m (6 ft 1 in)		28 – 9 April 1997
	15	(North Macedonia)	Abazović, Milan			28 – 28 September 1997
SG	23	(United States)	Tyus, Keevin	1.96 m (6 ft 5 in)	93 kg (205 lb)	32 – 25 November 1992
F	45	(United States)	Gilbert, Rantavious	2.03 m (6 ft 8 in)	109 kg (240 lb)	32 – 19 September 1993

Head coach

- (Greece) Vlasis Vlaikidis

Assistant coach(es)

- (North Macedonia) Vasko Atanasov

Legend

- (C) Team captain
- Injured

=== Depth chart ===
Pos.	Starting 5	Bench 1	Bench 2
C
PF	Rantavious Gilbert	Mihajlo Arsoski	Dimitar Delipetrov
SF	Aleksandar Šajkarov
SG	Keevin Tyus	Mihajlo Mitev
PG	Tyler Diehl	Petre Cvetkov	Dušan Mekendziev

== Strumica in FIBA competitions ==
1993 Radivoj Korać Cup

Round	Team	Home	Away
1.Round	(Ukraine) TIIT Kharkov	97–75	103–68

1997 Eurocup

Round	Team	Home	Away
Group stage	(Romania) CS Dinamo București	105–97	88–72
Group stage	(Turkey) Darüşşafaka S.K.	70–87	92–61
Group stage	(Montenegro) Budućnost Podgorica	71–90	97–70
Group stage	(Italy) Pallacanestro Trieste	98–82	107–76

2007 Eurocup

Round	Team	Home	Away
Qualifying round	(Croatia) Cedevita	75–69	76–72
Qualifying round	(Russia) PBC Lokomotiv Rostov	57–67	87–69

== Notable past players ==
- (Serbia) Nemanja Bešović
- (Serbia) Branislav Đekić
- (North Macedonia) Nenad Zivčević
