= KK Tikveš =

Tikvesh
- Leagues: Macedonian First League
- Founded: 1970
- Arena: Jasmin Sports Hall
- Capacity: 2,500
- Location: Kavadarci, North Macedonia
- Team colors: Red, Black, White
- Head coach: (North Macedonia) Goran Samardziev
- Championships: 3 Macedonian Championships; 2 Macedonian Cups; 1 BIBL
- Website: kkfeni.com
Home	Away

Active departments of Sports Club Tikvesh
Basketball	Handball	Football

Basketball Club Tikvesh (Macedonian: КК Тиквеш) is a professional basketball club based in Kavadarci, North Macedonia. They currently play in the Macedonian First League. KK Tikvesh is the first ever Macedonian club to win an international trophy in basketball, they won the 2010-11 EUROHOLD Balkan League.

== History ==
KK Tikvesh was founded on 11 January 1970.

Name: KK Tikvesh before it was Alumni Dekom Tikvesh (1995-1997), Orka Sport (1997-1999), Tikvesh (1999-2002), Feni Industries (2005-2019), EuroNickel 2005 (born 2019).

The team was taken under the leadership of the local FErro-NIckel mining company "Feni Industries AD" in 2005, while the smelter was under the control of Beny Steinmetz.

Since 2008, KK Tikvesh has organized the international basketball tournament “Dimitar Gjorgjiev", in Kavadarci.

- 2008 Champions The team from Kavadarci won their second championship title in season 2007/08 beating BC Strumica in the final play off 4-3 series.
- 2010 Champions Kvadarci team won their third championship in the season 2009/10 by beating BC Vardar in the final series play off 4-3 drama.
- 2011 Champions They won their fourth championship title in the season 2010/11 second in the row. This time the easiest final series against the heavy-weight BC Rabotnichki by 4-1 play off final series.
- BIBL Kavadarci team is one of the founding members of the BIBL League competition. They competed for 5 successful seasons in the BIBL league. They reached four semi-finals in the row. Ending 4th in the season 2009 and third in 2010, 2012. In their last season, 2017, they finished 6th.
- BIBL Champions Their biggest success came in the 2010/11 season winning the final four tournament in their home ground JASMIN ARENA. In the regular season they've finished 1 st in group B, having score 6-2, winning 3 games at home and 3 games away. Beating: Rilski 90:66 (humiliating victory), Mures 98:87, Balkan 101-72 (another humiliating victory) at home, and Mornar 95-84, Rilski 86-76, Balkan 83-76 away. At final four which was held in Kavadarci, at home ground first they've beat Mornar in the semi-finals by 82-75 in the tight game. After that in the final game Kavadarci team had an easy game against Rilski beating them by 88-75 in festive atmosphere at JASMIN ARENA winning the Championship.

In 2019, due to the difficulties of Steinmetz and because of the uncertain economic climate for the smelter's output, the company faced court-ordered administration. The result of this process was the sale of the smelter to an organization called Euronickel, who also took on the sponsorship of the basketball team. In the summer of 2023 EuroNickel planned to step down and stop being the main financial brand of Kavadarci club. However, company remained as the main sponsor of the club and the name was not changed.

== BIBL League Seasons ==
- 2009: (5-7) 4th
- 2010: (10-3) 3rd
- 2011: (8-2) 1st
- 2012: (7-6) 3rd
- 2017: (9-9) 6th

== Home arena ==
Jasmin Arena (Macedonian: " Јасмин") is a multi-purpose indoor sports arena located in Kavadarci, North Macedonia and seats 2,500 spectators.

The arena is used for basketball by KK Tikvesh. In May 2011, it hosted the Final Four of the Balkan International Basketball League.

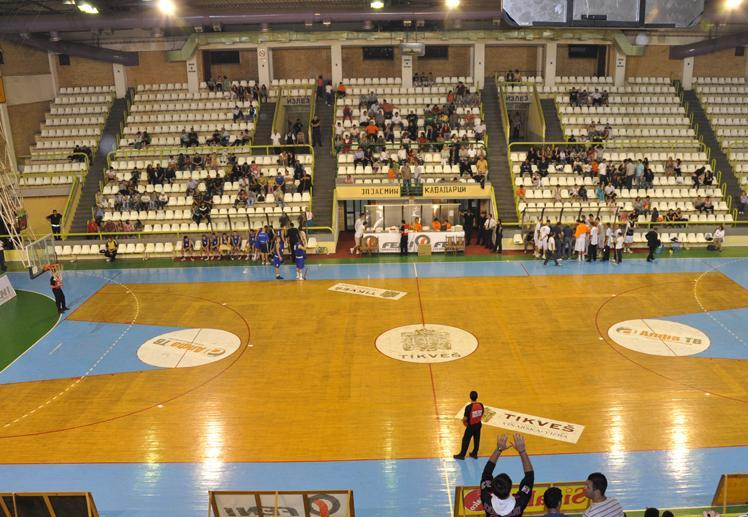
Jasmin Arena

== Honours ==
=== Domestic Achievements (North Macedonia) ===
- Macedonian Republic League Champion - 1985
- Macedonian League Champion - 2008, 2010, 2011
- Macedonian League Finalist - 2009, 2012
- Macedonian Cup Winner - 2008, 2010
- Macedonian Cup Finalist - 1997 (Tikveš), 1998 (Orka Sport), 2012, 2017

=== European Achievements (European Union) ===
- EUROHOLD Balkan League Champion - 2011
- EUROHOLD Balkan League Final Four - 2009, 2010, 2011, 2012

== Current squad ==
KK Tikvesh roster
Players
Coaches

Pos.	No.	Nat.	Name	Ht.	Age
G	2	(United States)	Hairstone, Donaven	1.88 m (6 ft 2 in)	25 – 11 April 2001
PG	3	(United States)	Green III, Mike	1.83 m (6 ft 0 in)
PF	7	(North Macedonia)	Koskoski, Gabriel	2.03 m (6 ft 8 in)	29 – 8 March 1997
F	9	(North Macedonia)	Zlatev, Todor	1.94 m (6 ft 4 in)	23 – 30 December 2002
PG	10	(North Macedonia)	Mladenović, Marjan	1.80 m (5 ft 11 in)	38 – 27 August 1987
F	14	(United States)	Quarry, Tom	2.01 m (6 ft 7 in)	26 – 1 October 1999
F	21	(United States)	Hunt, Bryce	2.01 m (6 ft 7 in)	25 – 7 July 2000
PF/C	28	(North Macedonia)	Gligorijević, Stevan	2.05 m (6 ft 9 in)	27 – 10 November 1998

Head coach

- (North Macedonia) Atanas Manev

Assistant coach(es)

- (North Macedonia) TBA

Team manager

Legend

- (C) Team captain
- Injured

- Roster
Updated: 2020-11-01

=== Depth chart ===
Pos.	Starting 5	Bench
C
PF
SF		Todor Zlatev
SG
PG	Marjan Mladenović

== Notable players ==
- (North Macedonia) Goran Samardziev
- (North Macedonia) Vojdan Stojanovski
- (North Macedonia) Ognen Stojanovski
- (North Macedonia) Darko Sokolov
- (North Macedonia) Todor Gečevski
- (North Macedonia) Dušan Bocevski
- (North Macedonia) Marko Simonovski
- (North Macedonia) Vladimir Brčkov
- (North Macedonia) Kiril Nikolovski
- (North Macedonia) Bojan Trajkovski
- (North Macedonia) Dime Tasovski
- (North Macedonia) Slobodan Mihajlovski
- (North Macedonia) Goce Andrevski
- (North Macedonia) Zlatko Gocevski
- (North Macedonia) Toni Simić
- (North Macedonia) Aleksandar Dimitrovski
- (North Macedonia) Marjan Gjurov
- (North Macedonia) Andrej Magdevski
- (North Macedonia) Predrag Pajić
- (Serbia) Marko Dimitrijević
- (Serbia) Dušan Knežević
- (Serbia) Vladimir Popović
- (Serbia) Milan Preković
- (Serbia) Boško Jovović
- (Serbia) Milos Vranes
- (Puerto Rico) James Life
- (Bulgaria) Ivan Lilov
- (United States) Randy Duck
- (United States) Tim Burroughs
- (United States) Donald Cole
- (United States) Taliek Brown
- (United States) Jarrid Frye
- (United States) Mychal Ammons
- (Croatia) Matija Češković
- (Croatia) Karlo Vragović
- (Georgia (country)) Giorgi Sharabidze
- (Dominican Republic) Carlos Morban

== Head coaches ==
- (North Macedonia) Emil Rajković
- (North Macedonia) Zare Markovski
- (North Macedonia) Ljupčo Malinkov
- (Montenegro) Miodrag Kadija
- (North Macedonia) Goran Samardziev
