= Đurasović =

Đurasović (Serbian Cyrillic: Ђурасовић; also transliterated Djurasović) is a Serbo-Croatian surname. Notable people with the surname include:

- Aleksa Đurasović (born 2002), Serbian footballer
- Božo Đurasović (born 1997), Bosnian basketball player
- Nikola Đurasović (born 1983), Serbian basketball player
- Veselin Đurasović (born 1957), former Bosnian footballer
- Viktor Durasovic (born 1997), Norwegian tennis player
