= Goran Dimitrijević =

Goran Dimitrijević may refer to:

- Goran Dimitrijević (basketball) (born 1970), Macedonian former basketball player
- Goran Dimitrijević (journalist) (born 1969), Serbian journalist, radio and television presenter and translator
