= Luka Petrovski =

Macedonian basketball player (born 1996)

Rabotnički
- Position: Shooting guard
- League: Macedonian First League

Personal information
- Born: 20 October 1996 (age 30) Skopje, Macedonia
- Listed height: 1.95 m (6 ft 5 in)

Career information
- Playing career: 2013–present

Career history
- 2013–2014: Strumica
- 2014–2016: MZT Skopje Aerodrom
- 2015: →Angeli
- 2016: PBC Tirana
- 2017: Rabotnički
- 2018: Karpoš Sokoli
- 2018–2020: Kumanovo
- 2020–2021: Akademija FMP
- 2021–2022: MZT Skopje 2
- 2022–2023: Kožuv
- 2023–2024: Akademija FMP
- 2024–2025: Nakhchivan BK
- 2025: KB Çair 2030
- 2026–present: Rabotnički

Luka Petrovski (born 20 October 1996) is a Macedonian professional basketball shooting guard for Rabotnički. He was also member of U-18 Macedonia national basketball team.

His father Slobodan Petrovski was also a basketball player.
