= Igor Mihajlovski =

Macedonian basketball player (born 1973)

Rabotnički
- Title: Assistant coach
- League: Macedonian First League

Personal information
- Born: 24 December 1973 (age 52) Kumanovo, SR Macedonia, SFR Yugoslavia
- Listed height: 2.05 m (6 ft 9 in)

Career information
- Playing career: 1988–2003
- Position: Forward
- Number: 6, 7, 9
- Coaching career: 2009–present

Career history

Playing
- 1988–1990: Kumanovo
- 1990–1992: Partizan
- 1992–1993: Borac Čačak
- 1993–1997: MZT Skopje
- 1997–1999: Rabotnički
- 1999–2000: Rogla Zrece
- 2000–2001: Porto
- 2001–2002: Kumanovo
- 2003: S.C. Lusitânia

Coaching
- 2009–2012: KK Mihajlovski
- 2012–2014: Macedonia U16
- 2014–2015: Kumanovo
- 2016–2017: Kožuv
- 2017: Kumanovo
- 2019–present: Rabotnički (ass.coach)

Career highlights
- As player: Euroleague champion (1992); YUBA League champion (1992); Yugoslav Cup winner (1992); 2× Macedonian League champion (1998, 1999); 2× Macedonian Cup winner (1997, 1998)

Igor Mihajlovski (Macedonian: Игор Михајловски; born December 24, 1973) is a Macedonian former professional basketball player and currently assistant coach of Rabotnički.

== Playing career ==
Mihajlovski has played with: KK Kumanovo, KK Partizan, KK MZT Aerodrom, KK Rabotnički, F.C. Porto, S.C. Lusitânia and Rogla Zrece. He won the Macedonian First League and Macedonian Basketball Cup with KK Rabotnički and KK MZT Aerodrom. With KK Partizan, he won the Euroleague title in 1992, national Championship and national Cup. He also helped his team to win the 1991–92 Yugoslav First Basketball League and Yugoslav Basketball Cup. As a member of the senior Macedonia national basketball team, he played at the EuroBasket 1999.

== Coaching career ==
Mihajlovski began his coaching career with the KK Mihajlovski in 2009. In 2014 until the beginning of 2015, Mihajlovski coached KK Kumanovo.
