= Kiril Pavlovski =

Macedonian basketball player

Personal information
- Born: September 18, 1983 (age 43) Skopje, Macedonia
- Listed height: 2.10 m (6 ft 11 in)

Career information
- Playing career: 1999–2018
- Position: Center

Career history
- 2000–2003: Rabotnički
- 2003–2004: Crvena zvezda
- 2004: Fon University
- 2004–2006: Rabotnički
- 2006–2007: Vardar Osiguruvanje
- 2007: Öresundskraft Basket
- 2008: Kraški zidar Sežana
- 2008–2009: Dinamo București
- 2009: AEK Larnaca
- 2009: Torus
- 2010: Otopeni
- 2010–2011: Lirija
- 2011–2012: Chernomorets
- 2012–2013: Kožuv
- 2013–2015: Karpoš Sokoli
- 2016: C.D Estela Santander
- 2016–2017: Rabotnički
- 2017-2018: Gostivar

Kiril Pavlovski (born September 18, 1983) is a Macedonian professional basketball center who last played for Rabotnički of the Macedonian First League.
