= Mavroskoufia Basketball Tournament =

- Founded: 1991; 35 years ago
- Country: Greece
- Number of teams: 4-11
- Current champions: Promitheas Patras B.C. (2024)
- Most championships: Iraklis Thessaloniki

Mavroskoufia or Simeon Mavroskoufis Basketball Tournament is an annual friendly tournament hosted under the auspices of the Thessaloniki Referees association. The tournament takes place before the opening of the new season in Thessaloniki and includes domestic and international teams. It started in 1991, months after the death of Simeon Mavroskoufis, a pioneer in Greek basketball and one of the founding members of FIBA, the first Greek international referee and elect of the Naismith Memorial Basketball Hall of Fame in 2000.

== History ==
The first edition in1991 was hosted by Iraklis at Ivanofeio Sports Arena. Ten more editions followed at the same court, until 2002 when newly built P.A.O.K. Sports Arena took over. In the years to follow Alexandreio Melathron (Nick Galis Hall) and Ivanofeio Sports Arena once again hosted the tournament. It was not held in 2007 and between 2020 and 2022 due to COVID-19 pandemic. During the first two decades the tournament was considered one of the most prestigious in Greek basketball with annual TV coverage. Recently Mavroskoufia' is broadcast live via Basketball Referees' Association of Thessaloniki website. Iraklis is the club with most participations at the tournament.

Many European clubs have participated in Mavroskoufia such as KK Crvena zvezda, Maccabi Ironi Ramat Gan, KK Kozuv, Olin Edirne, Beobanca, Maccabi Ra'anana, Maccabi Givatayim, PBC Academic, KK Budućnost, Valencia, GKK Šibenka and Gaziantep.

== Recent winners ==
- 2002: (Greece) GE Olympia Larissa
- 2003: (Greece) Iraklis
- 2004: (Greece) Iraklis
- 2005: (Greece) Aris B.C.
- 2006: (Greece) Aris B.C.
- 2007: not held
- 2008: (Greece) PAOK BC
- 2009: (Greece) Panellinios
- 2010: (Greece) PAOK BC
- 2011: (Turkey) Olin Edirne
- 2012: (Greece) Iraklis and (Greece) Anatolia
- 2013: (North Macedonia) KK Kozuv
- 2014: (North Macedonia) KK Kozuv
- 2015: (Greece) Aris B.C.
- 2016: (Greece) Kolossos Rodou
- 2017: (Greece) PAOK BC
- 2018: (Greece) PAOK BC
- 2019: (Greece) PAOK BC, Kolossos Rodou and Promitheas Patras
- 2020-2022: not held
- 2023: (Greece) PAOK BC
- 2024: (Greece) Promitheas Patras
- 2025: (Cyprus) AEK Larnaca

== Topscorers ==
- 2002: (Greece) Panagiotis Liadelis (Makedonikos)
- 2003: (United States) (Panama) Ruben Douglas (Panionios)
- 2004:
- 2005: (Greece) Giorgos Pavlidis (GSL)
- 2006: (United States) (Bosnia and Herzegovina) Terrel Castle
- 2007: not held
- 2008: (Greece) Kostas Vasileiadis (PAOK)
- 2009: (United States) Ricky Shields (ΕK Kavala)
- 2010: (United States) Rawle Marshall (PAOK)
- 2011: (Turkey) Ogun Sevinc (Οlin Edirne)
- 2012: (Greece) Dimitris Moutsiaras (Anatolia)
- 2013:
- 2014: (Serbia) Milan Janjušević (Kozuv)
- 2015: (United States) (Italy) Mike DiNunno (Iraklis)
- 2016: (Bulgaria) Dejan Ivanov (Gaziantep)
- 2017: (United States) Stefan Moody (Rethymno)
- 2018: (Greece) Dimitrios Mavroeidis (Kolossos)
- 2019: (United States) Steve Burtt Jr. (Ionikos)
- 2020-2022: not held
- 2023: * (United States) Skyler Flatten (ΠΑΟΚ)
- 2024: (United States) Darius Perry (Promitheas)

== MVP ==
MVP awards were given from 2003 until 2009.

- 2003: (Greece) Lazaros Papadopoulos (Iraklis)
- 2004: (United States) DeJuan Collins (Aris)
- 2005: (Greece) Antonis Asimakopoulos (Aris)
- 2006: (United States) (Bosnia and Herzegovina) Terrel Castle
- 2007: not held
- 2008: (Greece) Kostas Vasileiadis (PAOK)
- 2009: (Greece) (Bulgaria) Roderick Blakney (Panellinios)
