= Mirko Kovač =

Mirko Kovač is the name of:

- Mirko Kovač (basketball) (born 1983), Serbian professional basketball player
- Mirko Kovač (writer) (1938–2013), Yugoslav novelists
