= Miko Golubović =

Montenegrin basketball player

Miko Golubovic
Personal information
- Born: June 21, 1982 (age 44) Sombor, Serbia
- Listed height: 6 ft 9 in (2.06 m)
- Listed weight: 250 lb (113 kg)

Career information
- Playing career: 1999–present
- Position: Center

Career history
- 1999–2003: Spartak Subotica
- 2003–2005: Napredak Kruševac
- 2005–2007: Rudar Pljevlja
- 2007–2008: BC Rilski Sportist
- 2008–2009: CS Energia Rovinari
- 2009: Pelister
- 2009–2010: Omonia BC
- 2010–2011: ETHA Engomis
- 2011–2012: Napredak Kruševac
- 2012: Kozuv
- 2012–2013: Kumanovo
- 2013–2014: KAP Agia Paraskevis
- 2014: Pelister
- 2014–2015: Čelik
- 2015: Goce Delčev
- 2015: Strumica
- 2015–2016: Akademik Bulteks 99 Plovdiv
- 2016–2020: Pelister

Career highlights
- Cyprus Basketball Division 1 champion 2011; Cypriot Basketball Cup champion 2011; Cypriot Basketball Cup champion 2012

Miko Golubovic (born June 21, 1982) is a Montenegrin professional basketball player who last played for Pelister of the Macedonian First League (basketball). He also holds Macedonian citizenship.
