= Kumani (supporter group) =

Kumani Кумани
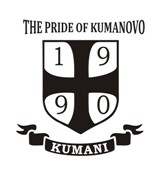
- Kumani West; Кумани Запад
- Founded: 1990, Yugoslavia
- Type: Supporters, Ultras group
- Stand: West
- Motto: You will never be alone my Kumanovo! Никад нема да си само мое Куманово!
- Headquarters: Kumanovo, North Macedonia
- Teams: RK Kumanovo; KK Kumanovo; FK Kumanovo
- Arenas: Sports Hall Kumanovo
- Website: website (in Macedonian)

Kumani (Macedonian: Кумани) is a name referring to Ultras supporters of various sports clubs from the city of Kumanovo in North Macedonia.

== History ==
The fans started to organize in the late 70's when there was an expansion of the creation of fan groups in Yugoslavia. The first fan groups were called: Ultras, Eagles, Front and Sokolanci (the most loyal fans of Kumani Zapad). In 1989 all of them united under the name Delta Force. This name didn't stay for long when on 19 February 1990 it was changed to Kumani. The name came from the Asian nomadic tribe Cumans that lived in Kumanovo in the Middle Ages. Their main transparent is Kumani-Zapad (Macedonian: Кумани-Запад).

== Rivalry ==
In March 2012 an incident was registered in Boris Trajkovski Arena between Kumani. and Lirija from Saraj municipality in Skopje. The first provocation started from Lirija fans when they were sitting and making noises when Macedonian anthem was playing. Later Kimani fans were fighting with the fans and the Police. In October 2012 in SRC Kale Kumani were fighting Komiti fans, police had to intervene and stands were emptied at halftime. October 2013 after an incident on the stands four Kumani members war arrested during a basketball game between KK Kumanovo and KK Vardar.

== See also ==
- Sports in Kumanovo
- Komiti Skopje fans from Skopje
- Čkembari fans from Bitola

== Gallery ==
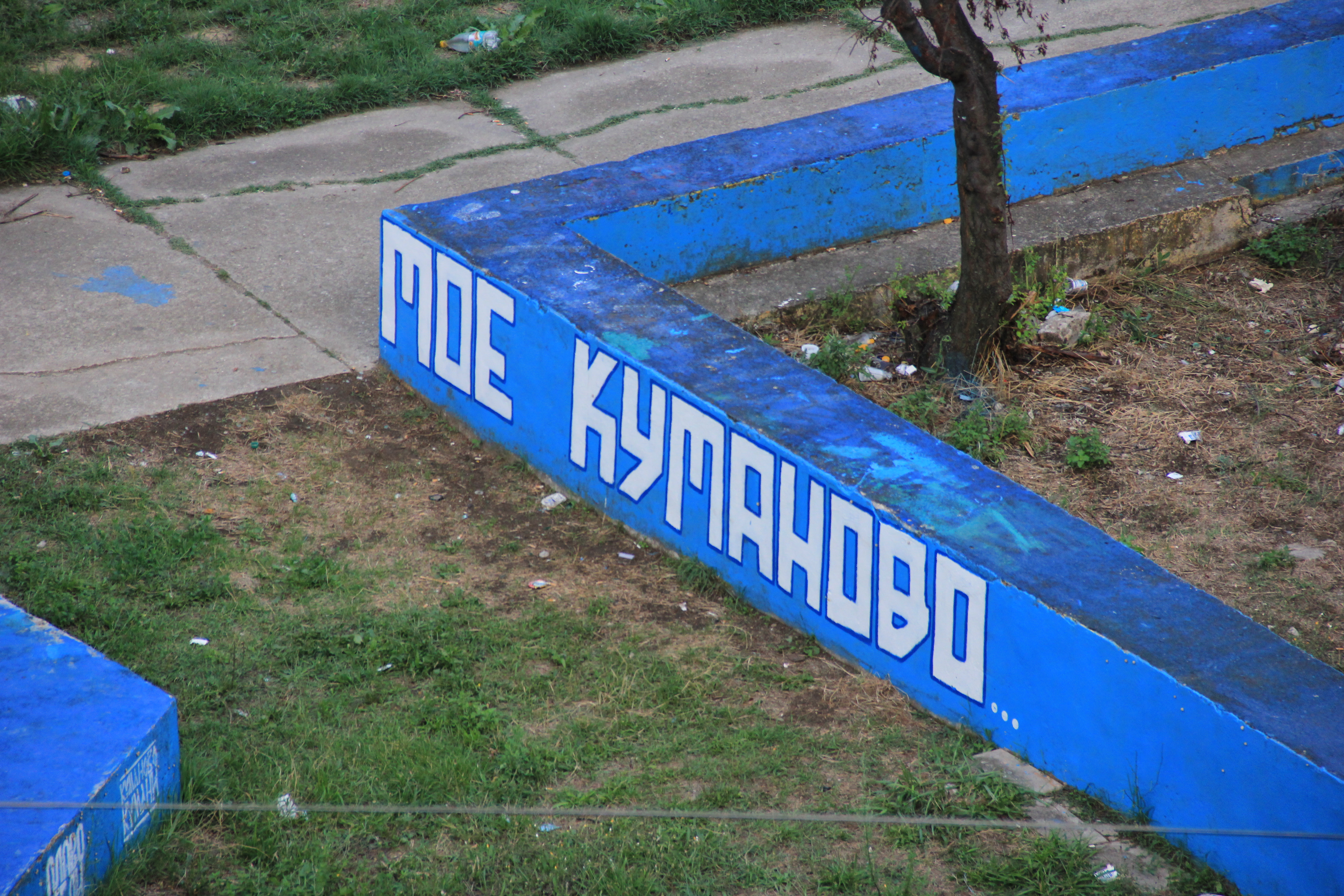
Kumani Graffiti in Kumanovo
