= Aleksandar Šterjov =

Macedonian basketball player

Aleksandar Sterjov
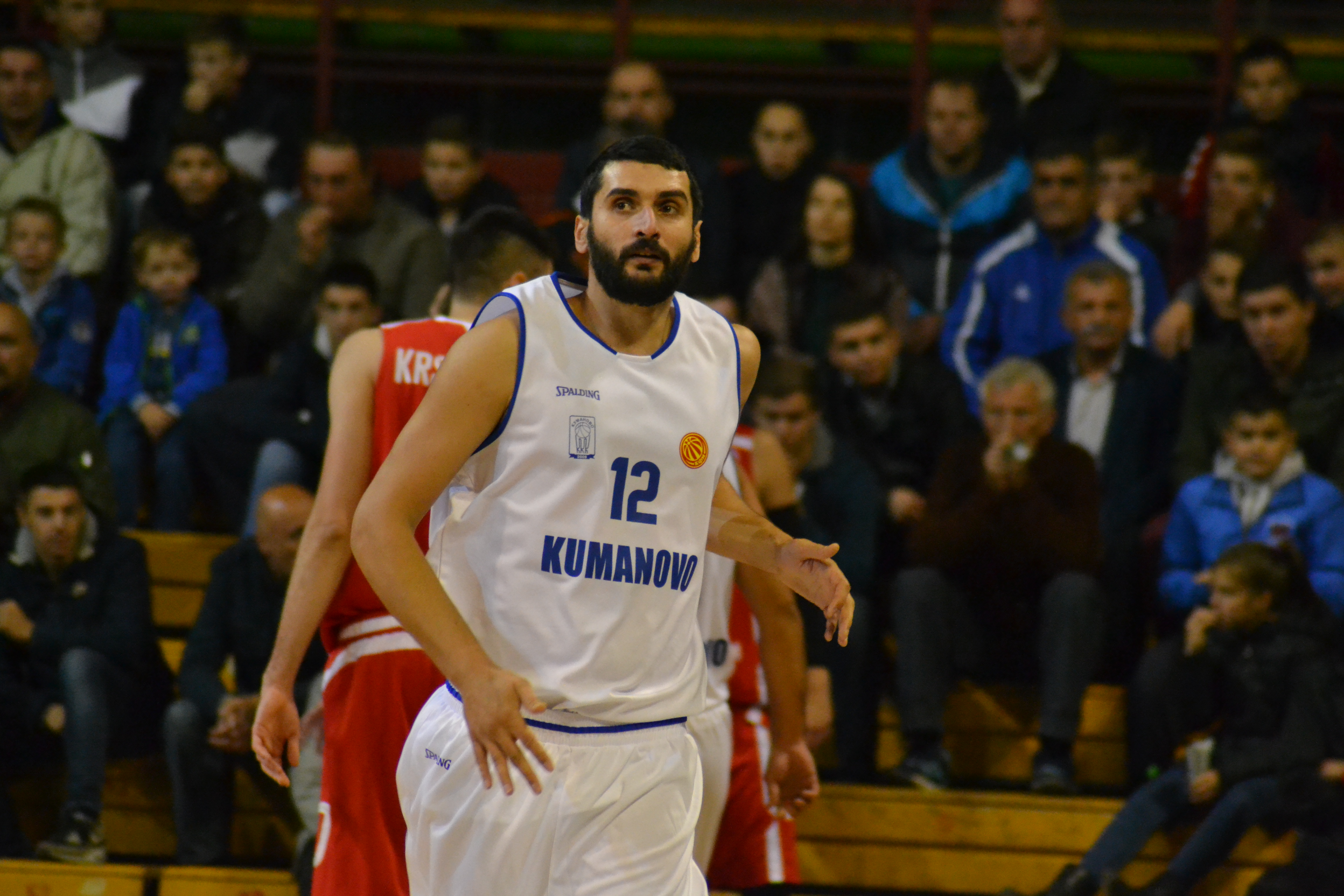

Kozuv
- Position: Power forward / center
- League: Macedonian First League

Personal information
- Born: May 15, 1986 (age 40) Skopje, SFR Yugoslavia
- Listed height: 6 ft 10 in (2.08 m)
- Listed weight: 218 lb (99 kg)

Career information
- Playing career: 2005–present

Career history
- 2005: Angeli
- 2006–2009: MZT Skopje Aerodrom
- 2009–2010: KK Plejmejker-Kubus Skopje
- 2010–2011: Vardar
- 2012: MZT Skopje Aerodrom
- 2012–2014: Kožuv
- 2014–2015: Kumanovo
- 2015–2017: Kožuv
- 2017–2018: Kumanovo
- 2018–2019: Kožuv
- 2019: AV Ohrid
- 2019–2021: Gostivar
- 2021–2022: EuroNickel 2005
- 2022–present: Kožuv

Career highlights
- Macedonian First League (2012); Macedonian Cup (2012)

Aleksandar Sterjov (born May 15, 1986) is a Macedonian professional basketball player who plays for Kožuv of the Macedonian First League (basketball).
