= Đorđe Jovanović (basketball) =

Serbian basketball player

Đorđe Jovanovic
Personal information
- Born: January 22, 1980 (age 46) SR Serbia, SFR Yugoslavia
- Listed height: 2.09 m (6 ft 10 in)

Career information
- NBA draft: 2002: undrafted
- Playing career: 1998–2012
- Position: Center

Career history
- 1998–1999: Budućnost Podgorica
- 1999–2001: Hopsi Polzela
- 2002–2003: BC Timișoara
- 2003–2004: OKK Beograd
- 2004–2005: Al-Wehdat SC
- 2005–2006: Krka
- 2007–2008: Al-Wehdat SC
- 2008: Parklji Bežigrad
- 2009–2010: Swisslion Pelister
- 2010: Ultimejt Basket Prilep
- 2011: Lirija
- 2011: Rilski Sportist
- 2011–2012: Rabotnički

Đorđe Jovanović (born January 22, 1980) is a former Serbian professional basketball player.
