= Goran Veselinovski =

Macedonian basketball player

Personal information
- Born: September 2, 1975 (age 51) Skopje, Macedonia
- Listed height: 1.90 m (6 ft 3 in)

Career information
- Playing career: 1995–2009
- Position: Shooting guard / small forward

Career history
- 1995–2009: Rabotnički
- 1995–1996: →Žito Vardar
- 1996–1997: →Kumanovo

Goran Veselinovski (born September 2, 1975) is a former Macedonian professional basketball Swingman who played for Rabotnički.
