= Peković =

Peković (Serbian: Пековић) is a Serbian surname. It may refer to:

- Branko Peković (born 1979), water polo player
- Dejan Peković (born 1973), footballer
- Miladin Peković (born 1983), basketball player
- Milorad Peković (born 1977), footballer
- Mitar Peković (born 1981), footballer
- Nikola Peković (born 1986), basketball player
- Radoslav Peković (born 1994), basketball player
