= Ivan Sazdov =

Macedonian basketball player

Personal information
- Born: December 10, 1983 (age 42) Macedonia
- Listed height: 1.80 m (5 ft 11 in)

Career information
- Playing career: 2005–present

Career history
- 2004–2005: Favoriti
- 2005–2006: Vardar
- 2006–2007: Toa Sum Jas
- 2007–2008: Vardar
- 2008–2009: Karpoš Sokoli
- 2009: AMAK SP
- 2010–2011: Rabotnički
- 2012: Lirija
- 2012–2013: Karpoš Sokoli
- 2014–2015: Vodnjanski Lisici

Ivan Sazdov (born 10 December 1983) is a Macedonian professional basketball guard.
