= Nemanja Jelesijević =

Serbian basketball player

Nemanja Jelesijevic
Personal information
- Born: 1 July 1979 (age 47) Novi Pazar, SR Serbia, SFR Yugoslavia
- Listed height: 6 ft 11 in (2.11 m)
- Listed weight: 220 lb (100 kg)

Career information
- Playing career: 1997–2015
- Position: Power forward / center

Career history
- 1997–1999: Mašinac
- 1999–2000: Partizan
- 2001–2002: Krka
- 2002–2003: Koper
- 2003–2004: Zlatorog Laško
- 2004–2005: Crvena zvezda
- 2005–2006: EnBW Ludwigsburg
- 2006: Maccabi Rishon LeZion
- 2006: Hapoel Galil Elyon
- 2006–2007: Mašinac
- 2007–2008: Zlatorog Laško
- 2008: MARSO Nyíregyházi
- 2008–2009: KD Hopsi Polzela
- 2009–2010: Czarni Słupsk
- 2010: Olympique Antibes
- 2010: KD Hopsi Polzela
- 2010–2011: Ovce Pole
- 2011: Torus
- 2011–2012: Kumanovo
- 2012–2013: Rabotnički
- 2013–2014: Étoile Sportive du Sahel
- 2014: Lirija
- 2015: Gimle BBK Bergen

Career highlights
- Radivoj Korać Cup champion (2000); Slovenian Cup champion (2004)
Medals
Men's basketball
Representing Serbia
FIBA Europe Under-18 Championship
Bronze medal – third place	1996 France	National Team

Nemanja Jelesijevic (born 1 July 1979) is a Serbian former professional basketball player.

== Euroleague career statistics ==
Legend
GP	Games played	GS	Games started	MPG	Minutes per game
FG%	Field-goal percentage	3P%	3-point field-goal percentage	FT%	Free-throw percentage
RPG	Rebounds per game	APG	Assists per game	SPG	Steals per game
BPG	Blocks per game	PPG	Points per game	PIR	Performance index rating
**Bold**	Career high

Year	Team	GP	GS	MPG	FG%	3P%	FT%	RPG	APG	SPG	BPG	PPG	PIR
2001–02	Krka	7	0	5:59	.455	.000	.625	1.0	0.1	0.1	.1	2.1	0.7
