= Paul Culbertson =

Paul Culbertson may refer to:

- Paul Culbertson (basketball) (born 1975), American basketball player
- Paul Trauger Culbertson Sr. (1897–1968), American diplomat and soldier
- W. Paul Culbertson (1918–2004), American politician, member of the South Carolina House of Representatives
