= Sports in Kumanovo =

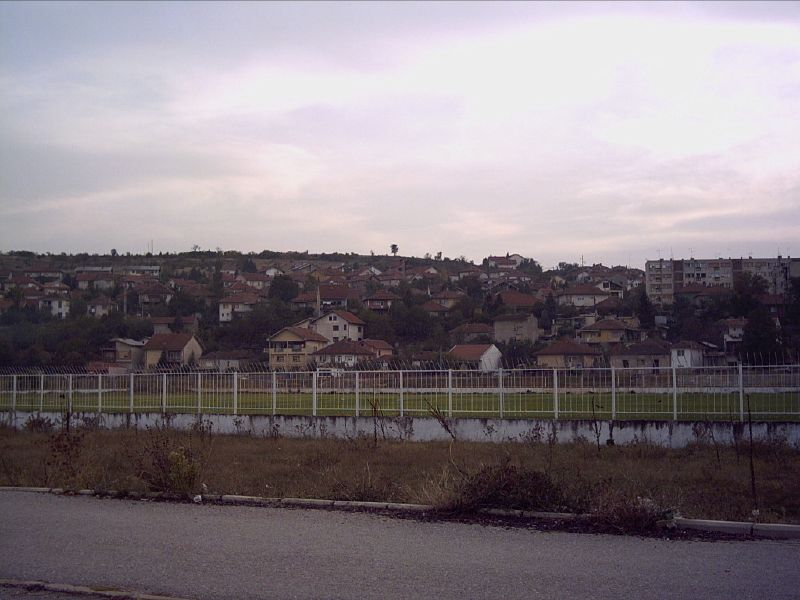
View of one of the Kumanovo football field

Kumanovo had some sporting life before Second World War. After the war there is intensity in sport development. Socialist syndicate organizations and their "massive sporting culture" lead to results in sports and higher educated gym professors.

== Football in Kumanovo ==
The most notable football club in Kumanovo after second World War was FK "11 Oktomvri". Later through the clubs "Dinamo" and "Edinstvo" transformed itself into "Kumanovo" that we know today. FK Kumanovo was champion of Macedonian Football League in 1971. KF Bashkimi 1947 and KF Milano Kumanovë are the most successful football teams in Kumanovo. Many notable footballers like Naser Aliji, Armend Alimi, Saša Ćirić, Stole Dimitrievski, Ardon Jashari, Mensur Kurtishi, Taulant Seferi, Lindon Selahi are from Kumanovo.

== Basketball in Kumanovo ==
KK Kumanovo is a basketball team who competes in the first Macedonian First League, Balkan International Basketball League. Since 2015 the Team competes in the newly formed Europe Cup. Another basketball team is KB Rinia Kumanovë.

== Handball in Kumanovo ==
RK Kumanovo -Shevro represented Kumanovo in EHF 1993/94 Men's Cup Winners' Cup.

== Boxing in Kumanovo ==
Kumanovo have 2 medals from the Olympic Games. Redzep Redzepovski silver medal in Los Angeles 1984 and Ace Rusevski in Montreal 1976. Rusevski also has a European champion medal from 1977.

== See also ==
- FK Kumanovo
- KK Kumanovo Men's Basketball club
- RK Kumanovo Men's Handball club
- Sports Hall Kumanovo
- Sports Hall Sokolana
