= Budimir Jolović =

Macedonian-Serbian basketball player

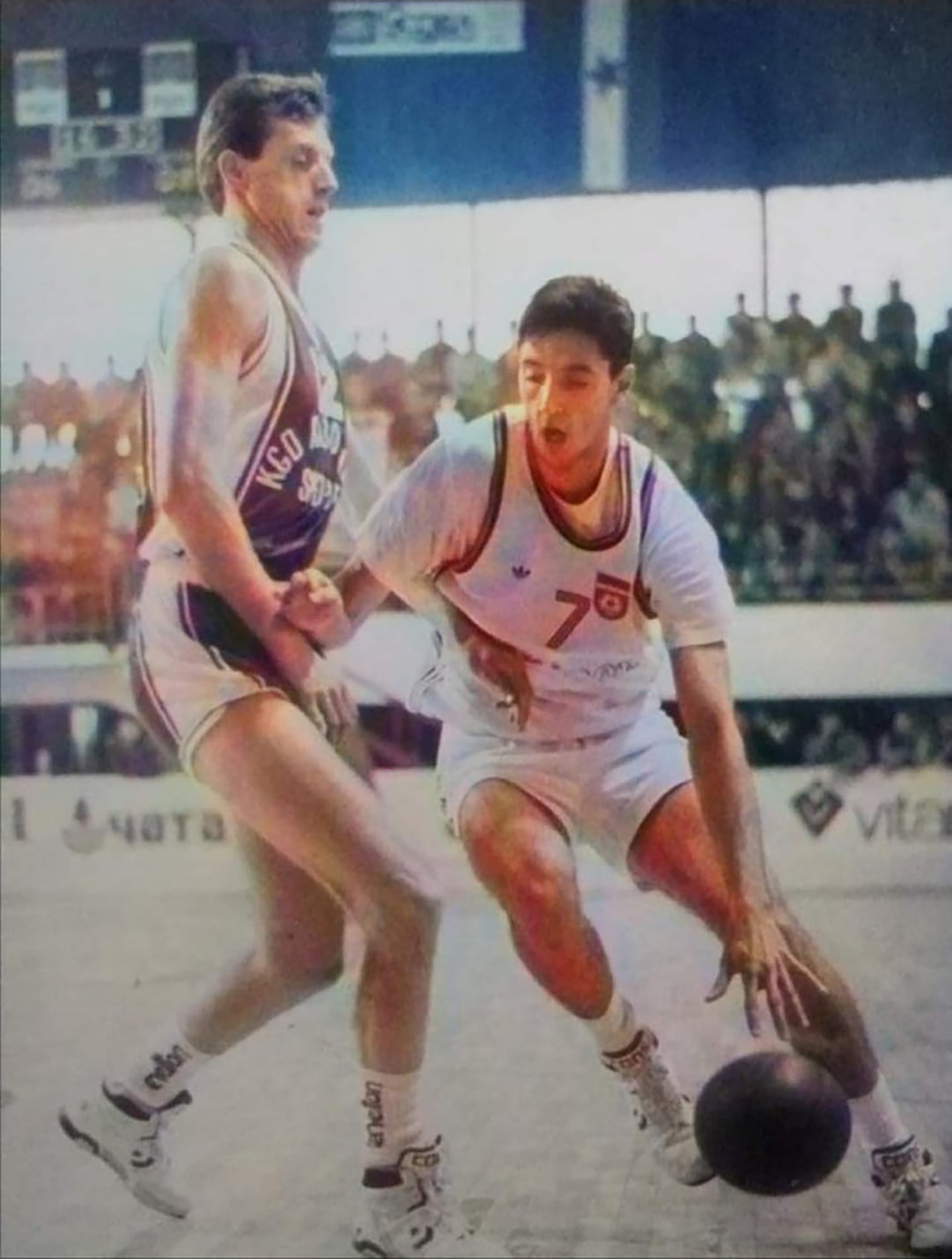
- Budimir Jolović (left) & Toni Kukoć (right)

Personal information
- Born: October 3, 1959 (age 67) Novi Pazar, Serbia, Yugoslavia
- Listed height: 1.98 m (6 ft 6 in)

Career information
- Playing career: 1979–2005
- Position: Small forward

Career history
- 1979–1981: OKK Novi Pazar
- 1981–1983: Borac Čačak
- 1983–1986: Kumanovo
- 1986–1991: Rabotnički
- 1991–1992: MZT Skopje
- 1992–1993: Meysuspor Kayseri
- 1993–1996: Gostivar
- 1996–1998: Kumanovo
- 1998–1999: Vardar
- 1999–2002: Nikol Fert
- 2008–2009: Karpoš Sokoli

Career highlights
- Award from KK Kumanovo, for special contribution in advancement of the sport of Basketball in the Municipality of Kumanovo. (2009); National Cup of Macedonia winner (2001); National Cup of Macedonia MVP (2001); National League of Macedonia winner (1999-2000); National Cup of Macedonia winner (1999-2000); Best 10 athletes of Municipality of Kumanovo (1997); Best athlete of Municipality of Kumanovo (1996); Award for best athlete of the city of Novi Pazar (1981)

Budimir Jolović (born October 3, 1959) is a former Macedonian-Serbian professional basketball small forward who last played for KK Karpoš Sokoli in his last season as a pro player, he was 49 years old and scored 30 points in one game against KK Torus that season.

His fruitful career blossomed in Macedonia, as he played most of his professional career there. He also worked as a coach in a few teams in his career.

His coaching days started as a double licensed player/coach in KK Kumanovo in 1997. After that he took a job as an assistant coach of the young boys National Team in Macedonia in the summer of 2004. They competed in the 2004 FIBA Europe Under-16 Championship Division B where the team took the silver medal and qualified for the A division for the first time in history for any Macedonian National Team.

In 2006 he worked as a coach in KK AMAK SP and KK MM College. He had success with both of them playing and advancing in the First Basketball League in Macedonia.

In 2011 he coached one of the most successful Macedonian basketball teams KK MZT Skopje which he led to top of the table.

After the professional teams engagements he decided that he is ready to work with young talent, so he taught in the State school for physical culture "Metodi Mitevski - Brico" in Skopje.

In the summer of 2016 he was in the coaching staff for the EuroBasket 2017 qualification team for Macedonia, alongside Dragan Raca.
