= Lazar Lečić =

Macedonian-Serbian basketball coach (1939–2024)

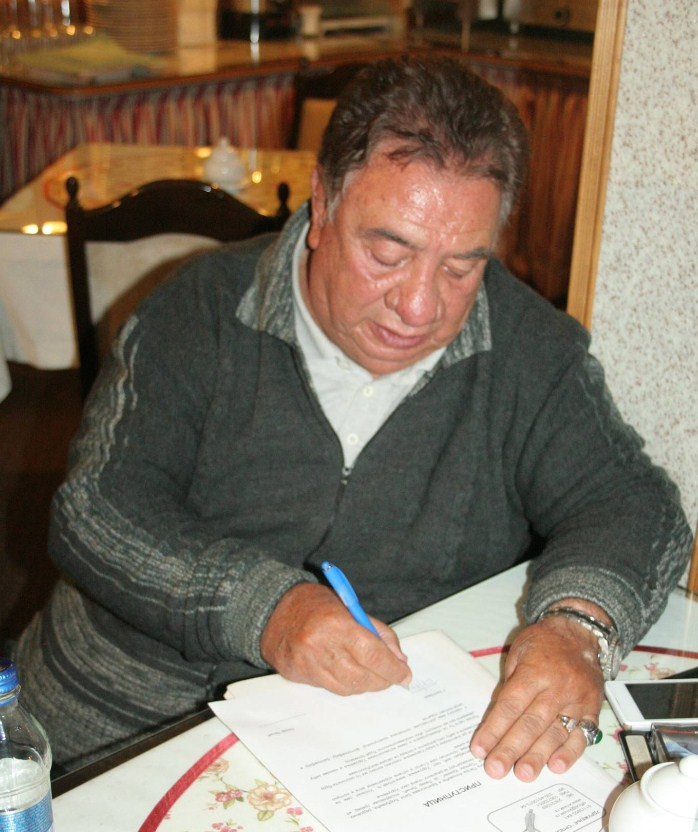
- Lečić in 2018

Personal information
- Born: 30 January 1939 Skopje, Yugoslavia
- Died: 13 August 2024 (aged 85) Skopje, North Macedonia

Career information
- Playing career: 1957–1962
- Coaching career: 1962–2000

Career history

Playing
- 1957–1962: Rabotnički

Coaching
- 1962–1972: Rabotnički
- 1972–1973: Borac Čačak
- 1973–1975: Olimpija Ljubljana
- 1975–1978: Rabotnički
- 1978–1982: Olimpija Ljubljana
- 1982–1983: Vojvodina
- 1983–1988: MZT Skopje
- 1990–1992: Aris
- 1996: MZT Skopje
- 1999–2000: Nikol Fert

Career highlights
- Greek Basketball League (1991); Greek Basketball Cup (1992); Basketball Cup of Macedonia (1996)

Lazar "Grk" Lečić (Macedonian: Лазар Лечиќ; 30 January 1939 – 13 August 2024) was a Yugoslav and later Macedonian professional basketball coach and player. He is considered the founder of Macedonian basketball, who had a huge role in the exit of Macedonian basketball clubs in Europe in the 1970s and 1980s. Lečić was also responsible for founding and organising the youth basketball schools in both North Macedonia and Greece. In his lifelong odyssey he has won many prestigious awards such as "Giant" of the Macedonian Olympic Committee (2002), "Giant" of the Basketball Federation of Macedonia, "11th of October, 13th of November, 8 September, Zlatna Bubamara among many others.

Lazar Lečić died on 13 August 2024, at the age of 85.

== Early life ==
Lečić was born on 30 January 1939 in Skopje. He finished middle school in Skopje, while he gained his higher education in Belgrade in 1963.

== Professional career ==
Lazar Lečić started his professional career in Rabotnički in 1957 and stayed in the club with the player status until 1962 before moving to the coaching position. As a player he won two Macedonian Republic League titles in 1960 and 1961. However, his true impact in basketball was yet to begin. In 1962 he sat on the coaching position in Rabotnički and immediately made an impact. As a dominating force in Macedonia under the wings of Lečić, Rabotnički won the following two titles in 1963 and 1964, and the team moved to First Federal Basketball League. Lečić stayed in Skopje until 1972 before moving on for another challenge in Borac Cacak for the 1972–73 season when the team finished 4th in Yugoslav First Basketball League as the club's biggest achievement in history. For the next season he moved to Olimpija Ljubljana in Slovenia, before taking on another adventure in Rabotnički in 1975. This time leading the club from Skopje to the semifinals of the 1975–76 FIBA European Cup Winners' Cup, that is still one of the biggest successes in the team history. In the same season Rabotnički reached the final of the Yugoslav Basketball Cup for the first time. In 1978 Lečić moved back to Olimpija Ljubljana where he stayed until 1982 when he reached the final of the Yugoslav Basketball Cup. After a season at Vojvodina Lečić was back at his home town, but this time at Skopje, later known as MZT Skopje. In 1986 by leadership of Lazar Lečić, MZT Skopje reached the Yugoslav First Basketball League where they competed for two seasons. In 1990 Lečić moved to the Greek team Aris where he competed in the EuroLeague, reaching the Quarterfinals in the 1990–91 season. He also won the Greek League in 1990–91 and Greek Cup in 1991–92. After another season in MZT Skopje in 1996 when he won the Macedonian Cup and also made the Korać Cup R64, he temporarily resigned, but finished his wealthy career in Nikol Fert in the 1999-00 season.

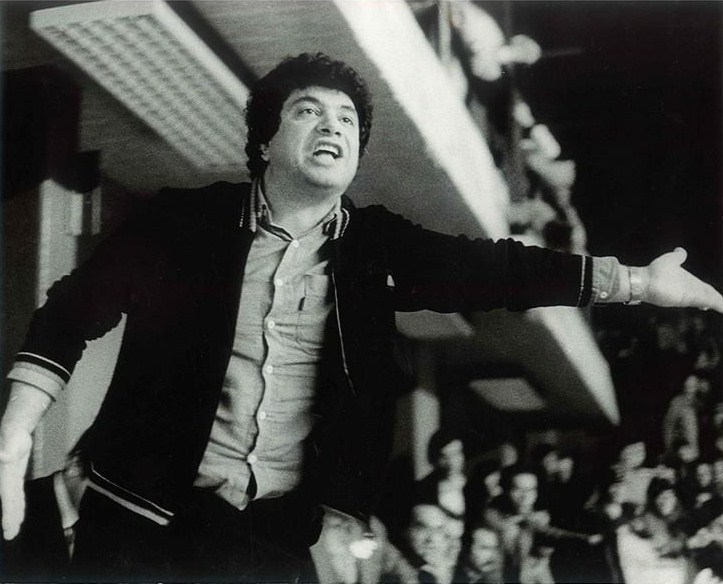
Lazar Lečić coaching his team during a game.

Besides the club career, Lazar Lečić had an amazing national career as a coach in the Yugoslav National Team. He was an assistant coach in the Yugoslav team first golden medal in 1970 FIBA World Championship held in Yugoslavia. He also had an impact in the dominating years when Yugoslavia won medals in several competitions such as FIBA Eurobasket, Mediterranean Games and Balkan Championships among others. He also led Yugoslavia in the European Youth Basketball Championship in 1971.

In the Serbian film We Will Be the World Champions from 2015, Lečić was portrayed by the Macedonian actor Saško Kocev.
