= Darko Matic (basketball) =

Retired Serbian basketball player (born 1984)

Darko Matić
Personal information
- Born: March 18, 1984 (age 42) Belgrade, SR Serbia, Yugoslavia
- Listed height: 6 ft 4 in (1.93 m)
- Listed weight: 195 lb (88 kg)

Career information
- NBA draft: 2006: undrafted
- Playing career: 2002–2015
- Position: Point guard

Career history
- 2006–2008: Zemun
- 2008–2009: Superfund
- 2009–2010: SCM CSU Craiova
- 2010–2012: Kumanovo
- 2012–2013: Doxa Lefkadas
- 2013: Karpos Sokoli
- 2013–2014: HKK Čapljina Lasta
- 2014: Liria
- 2014–2015: Plana

Darko Matić (born March 18, 1984) is a Serbian retired professional basketball player.
