= Dragan Smiljanić =

Serbian basketball player

Personal information
- Born: March 6, 1970 (age 56) Užice, SR Serbia, SFR Yugoslavia
- Listed height: 2.09 m (6 ft 10 in)

Career information
- NBA draft: 1992: undrafted
- Playing career: 1990–2006
- Position: Center

Career history
- 1996–1997: Hapoel Galil Elyon
- 1997–1998: Rabotnički
- 1998: Stal Ostrów Wielkopolski
- 1999: AEK Larnaca B.C.
- 1999–2000: PBC Ural Great Perm
- 2000: SKS Starogard Gdański
- 2000: Adecco Olympique Lausanne
- 2001–2002: Leiria B.C.
- 2002–2003: BC Dombóvár
- 2004–2005: Gradina
- 2005–2006: 08 Stockholm Human Rights

Dragan Smiljanić (born March 3, 1970) is a former Serbian professional basketball player who last played for 08 Stockholm Human Rights.
