= Vladimir Filipović =

Serbian basketball player

Personal information
- Born: July 28, 1985 (age 41) Leskovac, SFR Yugoslavia
- Listed height: 1.96 m (6 ft 5 in)
- Listed weight: 88 kg (194 lb)

Career information
- Playing career: 2001–2023
- Position: Shooting guard

Career history
- 2001–2007: Zdravlje
- 2007–2010: Rabotnički
- 2010–2011: Ovce Pole
- 2011: Rabotnički
- 2011–2012: Lirija
- 2012–2014: Kožuv
- 2014–2015: Karpoš Sokoli
- 2015: Kumanovo
- 2015–2016: Zdravlje
- 2018–2019: Fair Play Niš
- 2019–2021: Vlasotince
- 2021–2022: Knjaževac 1950
- 2022–2023: Radan Lebane

Career highlights
- Macedonian First League (2009); Macedonian Cup (2011)

Vladimir Filipović (born July 28, 1985) is a former Serbian professional basketball player.

== Professional career ==
During his career, Filipović played for KK Zdravlje, KK Rabotnički, KK Ovce Pole, KK Pelister, Lirija KK Kozuv and KK Karpoš Sokoli.

On January 9, 2015, he signed with KK Kumanovo.
