= KK Lirija =

KK Lirija/KB Liria
- Founded: 1977
- Dissolved: 2014
- Arena: SRC Kale (capacity: 300)
- Location: Skopje, North Macedonia
- Team colors: Blue and White
Home	Away

KK Lirija (Albanian: KB Liria; Macedonian: КК Лирија) is a defunct basketball club based in Skopje, North Macedonia. They played in the Macedonian First League until the season 2013/2014.

== History ==
The club was founded on 1977.

== Achievements ==
- Macedonian Cup

Runners-up: 2014

== Notable former players ==
- (North Macedonia) Toni Simić
- (North Macedonia) Dime Tasovski
- (North Macedonia) Nenad Zivčević
- (North Macedonia) Boban Stajić
- (North Macedonia) Bojan Trajkovski
- (North Macedonia) Goran Samardziev
- (North Macedonia) Enes Hadžibulić
- (North Macedonia) Miroslav Despotović
- (North Macedonia) Kiril Pavlovski
- (North Macedonia) Siniša Avramovski
- (North Macedonia) Aleksandar Ugrinoski
- (North Macedonia) Nikola Karakolev
- (North Macedonia) Aleksandar Sovkovski
- (North Macedonia) Ivan Sazdov
- (North Macedonia) Labinot Idrizi
- (North Macedonia) (Kosovo) Muhamed Thaçi
- (North Macedonia) (Kosovo) Jetmir Zeqiri
- (Albania) (Kosovo) Edmond Azemi
- (Dominican Republic) Carlos Morban
- (Puerto Rico) James Life
- (Serbia) Nemanja Jelesijević
- (Serbia) Darko Matić
- (Serbia) Djordje Jovanović
- (Serbia) Vladimir Filipović
- (Serbia) Boško Jovović
- (Serbia) Aleksandar Kalanj
- (Bosnia and Herzegovina) Aleksej Nešović
- (Bosnia and Herzegovina) Aleksandar Radojević
- (Montenegro) Balša Radunović
- (Montenegro) Marko Mijović
- (United States) Tyrone Nared
- (United States) Julius Coles
- (United States) Dustin Mitchell

== Gallery ==
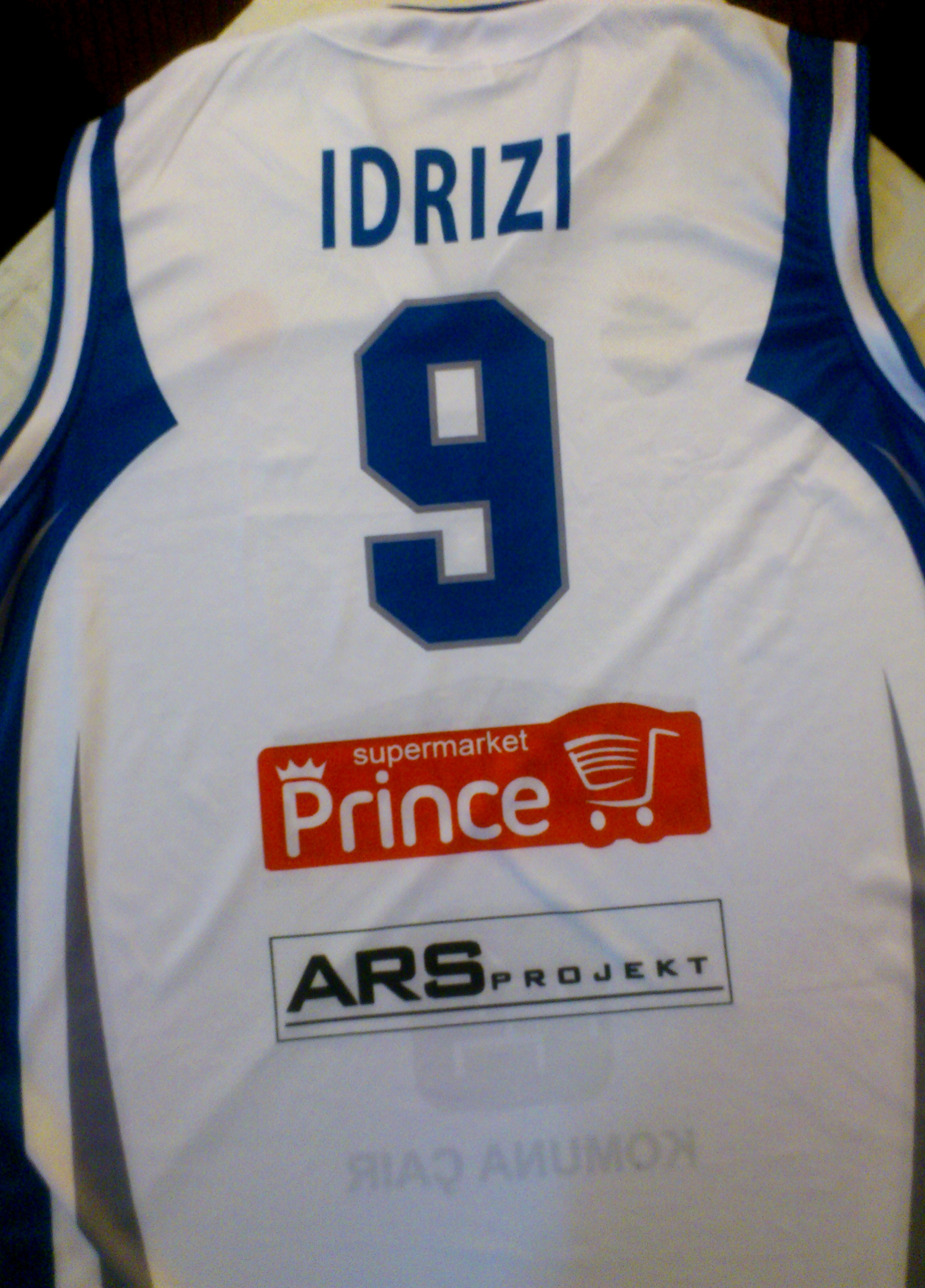
2013/14 home kit of the captain Labinot Idrizi

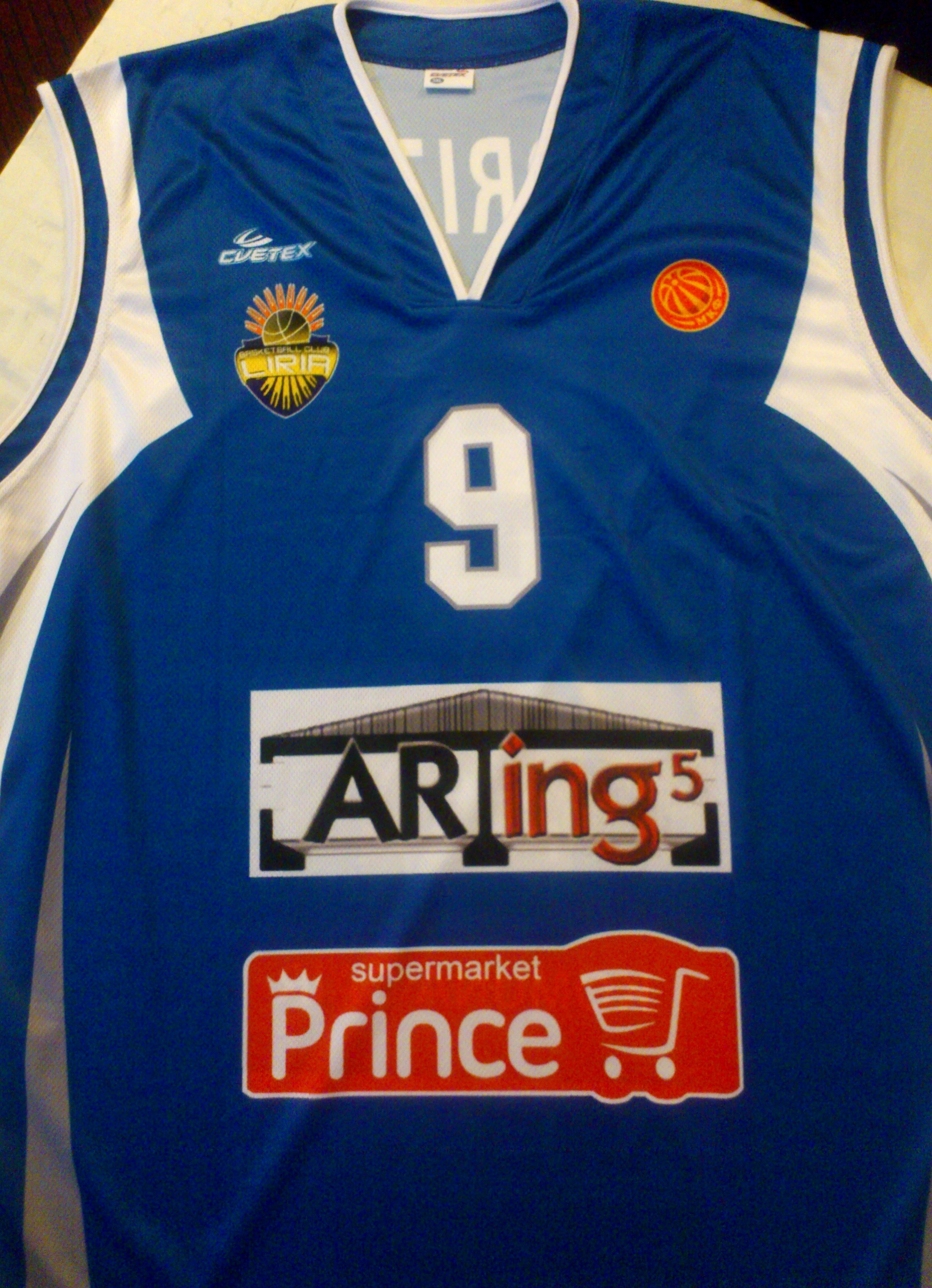
Guest kit
