= William Coleman (basketball) =

American professional basketball player

Free agent
- Position: Center

Personal information
- Born: November 16, 1988 (age 37) Columbus, Georgia
- Listed height: 6 ft 9 in (2.06 m)
- Listed weight: 250 lb (113 kg)

Career information
- High school: Glenwood (Phenux City, Alabama)
- College: Miami Dade (2007–2009); Memphis (2009–2011)
- NBA draft: 2011: undrafted
- Playing career: 2011–present

Career history
- 2011–2012: Le Mans Sarthe
- 2012–2013: Kavala
- 2013–2014: Budućnost Podgorica
- 2014: Rabotnički
- 2014: Hapoel Holon
- 2014–2015: Panionios
- 2015–2016: s.Oliver Baskets
- 2016: Muğla Ormanspor
- 2017: Mid-South Echoes

William Coleman (born November 16, 1988) is an American professional basketball player who last played for Mid-South Echoes of the American Basketball Association.

== College career ==
In May 2011, Coleman graduated with a bachelor's degree in Interdisciplinary Studies. In the same year, he was awarded the 2011 Conference USA Spirit of Service Award for his contributions in community service and for having good academic standing.

== Professional career ==
On August 10, 2011, he signed with French club Le Mans Sarthe for the 2011–12 season.

On August 19, 2012, he signed with Greek club Kavala for the 2012–13 season.

On August 14, 2013, he signed with Montenegrin club Budućnost Podgorica. On March 27, 2014, he left Budućnost and signed with Macedonian club Rabotnički for the rest of the season.

On August 6, 2014, he signed a one-year deal with Israeli club Hapoel Holon. On November 6, 2014, he parted ways with Hapoel. Five days later, he signed with Greek club Panionios for the rest of the season.

On June 23, 2015, he signed with s.Oliver Baskets for the 2015–16 season.

== The Basketball Tournament ==
William Coleman played for Team Memphis State in the 2018 edition of The Basketball Tournament. He averaged a team-high 18.5 points per game and 5.0 rebounds per game on 76 percent shooting. Team Memphis State reached the second round before falling to Team DRC.
