= Boško Jovović =

Serbian basketball player

Personal information
- Born: 10 October 1983 (age 43) Belgrade, SR Serbia, Yugoslavia
- Listed height: 2.05 m (6 ft 9 in)

Career information
- NBA draft: 2005: undrafted
- Playing career: 2001–present
- Position: Power forward

Career history
- 2005–2006: Napredak Rubin
- 2006–2007: Pelister
- 2007–2008: Feni Industries
- 2008–2009: Napredak Rubin
- 2009–2011: Feni Industries
- 2011–2012: Smederevo 1953
- 2012: Peristeri
- 2012–2013: Liria
- 2013: BC Balkan Botevgrad
- 2013–2014: Crnokosa
- 2014–2015: Feni Industries
- 2015–2016: Academic Plovdiv
- 2016–2017: Cergy Pontoise Basket
- 2019–2020: US Maubeugeoise

Boško Jovović (born 10 October 1983) is a Serbian professional basketball player who last played for Union Sportive Maubeugeoise of the France NM2.
