= Ninoslav Tmušić =

Serbian basketball player

Personal information
- Born: July 18, 1973 (age 53) Prijepolje, SR Serbia, SFR Yugoslavia
- Listed height: 2.05 m (6 ft 9 in)

Career information
- Playing career: 1998–2013
- Position: Center

Career history
- 1998–2000: Mogren
- 2000–2001: Kolubara
- 2001–2002: Mogren
- 2002–2004: Prokuplje
- 2004: Polo Trejd Strumica
- 2004–2005: Igokea
- 2005–2007: Tundja Yambol
- 2007–2008: Dunav 2007 Ruse
- 2008: Novi Sad
- 2008–2009: HKK Grude
- 2009: AMAK SP
- 2010–2011: Yambol
- 2011–2012: Jagodina
- 2012–2013: Karpoš Sokoli

Ninoslav Tmušić (born July 18, 1973) is a former Serbian professional basketball player who last played for Karpoš Sokoli.
