= Blagoja Georgievski =

Macedonian basketball player (1950–2020)

Personal information
- Born: 15 October 1950 Skopje, PR Macedonia, Yugoslavia
- Died: 29 January 2020 (aged 69) Skopje, North Macedonia
- Listed height: 6 ft 0 in (1.83 m)

Career information
- Playing career: 1968–1984
- Position: Point guard

Career history
- 1968–1984: Rabotnički

Blagoja Georgievski (alternate spelling: Blagoje Georgijevski, Macedonian: Благоја Георгиевски; 15 October 1950 – 29 January 2020) was a Macedonian professional basketball player and coach. He represented the Yugoslavia national basketball team internationally.

== National team career ==
Georgievski competed for SFR Yugoslavia in the 1972 Summer Olympics and in the 1976 Summer Olympics.

Olympic Games
Preceded by Lazar Popovski	Flagbearer for FYR Macedonia; Athens 2004	Succeeded by Atanas Nikolovski
