= Daniel Nacevski =

Macedonian basketball player

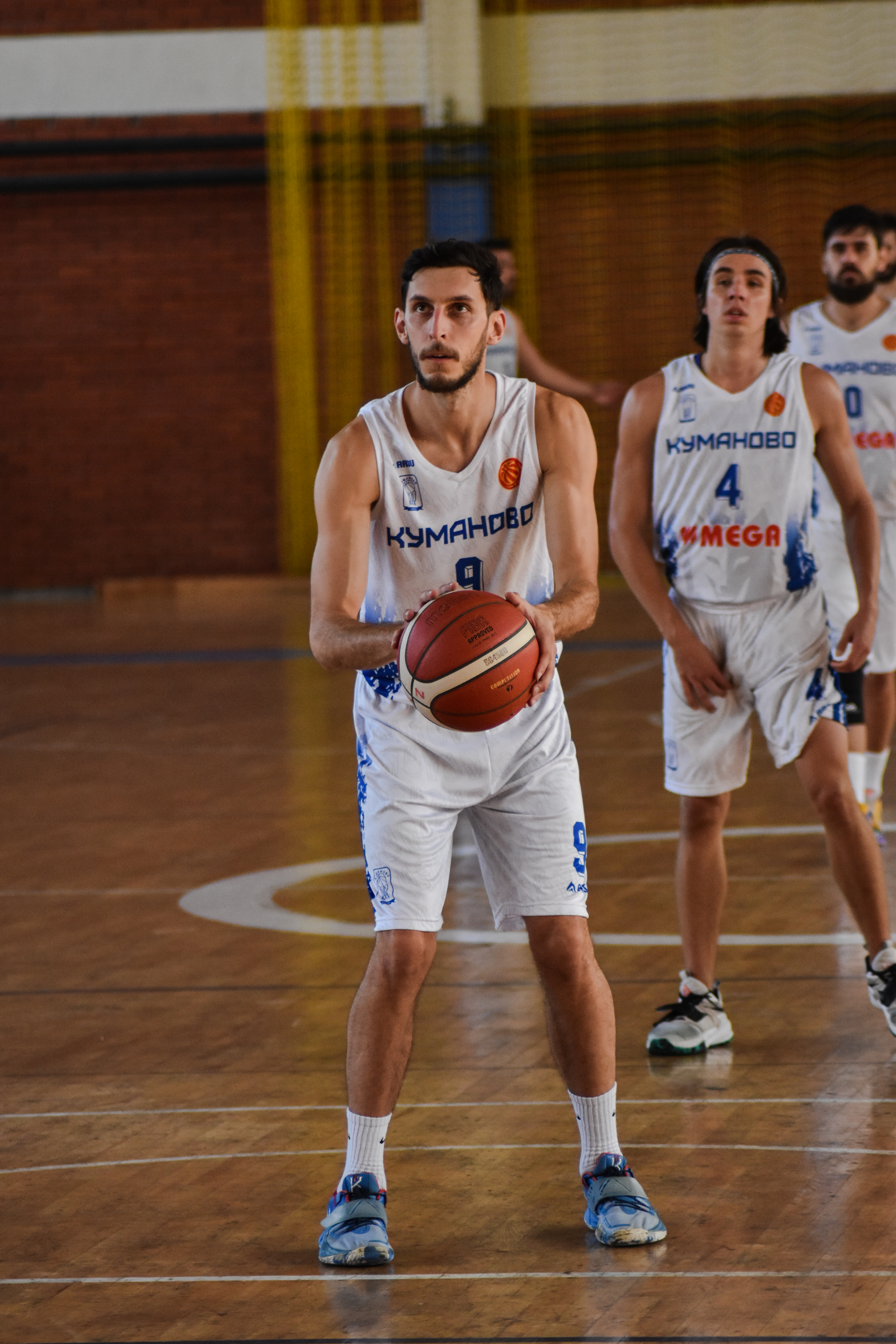

Pelister
- Position: Guard
- League: Macedonian First League

Personal information
- Born: August 6, 1995 (age 31) Štip, Macedonia
- Listed height: 1.94 m (6 ft 4 in)

Career information
- Playing career: 2012–present

Career history
- 2012–2015: Vardar Apave
- 2015–2019: Kožuv
- 2019–2020: Akademija FMP
- 2020–present: Pelister

Daniel Nacevski (born August 6, 1995) is a Macedonian professional basketball Guard who currently plays for Pelister in the Macedonian First League.
