= Vlatko Nedelkov =

Macedonian basketball player

Personal information
- Born: July 13, 1985 (age 41) Macedonia
- Listed height: 1.83 m (6 ft 0 in)
- Position: Guard

Career history
- 2002–2006: Žito Vardar
- 2006–2007: Feni Industries
- 2007–2009: AMAK SP
- 2009–2010: Feni Industries
- 2011–2015: Borec Veles

Vlatko Nedelkov (born July 13, 1985) is a former Macedonian professional basketball Guard who played for Žito Vardar, AMAK SP, Feni Industries and Borec Veles.
