= Božo Đurasović =

Bosnian basketball player (born 1987)

No. 7 – Leotar
- Position: Small forward
- League: Bosnia and Herzegovina Championship

Personal information
- Born: August 7, 1987 (age 39) Dubrovnik, SR Croatia, SFR Yugoslavia
- Listed height: 2.00 m (6 ft 7 in)
- Listed weight: 92 kg (203 lb)

Career information
- NBA draft: 2009: undrafted
- Playing career: 2007–present

Career history
- 2007: Bosna
- 2011: Gießen 46ers
- 2012: Polytekhnika-Halychyna
- 2012: Leotar
- 2012–2013: BBC Monthey
- 2013–2014: Steaua CSM EximBank
- 2015–2016: SCM U Craiova
- 2016: Leotar
- 2017: Zrinjski
- 2017–2018: Dynamic VIP PAY
- 2018: UJAP Quimper 29
- 2018–2019: Tigers Tübingen
- 2019–2020: KTE-Duna Aszfalt
- 2020–present: KK Leotar

Božo Đurasović (born August 7, 1987) is a Bosnian professional basketball player for Leotar of the Bosnia and Herzegovina Championship.

== Playing career ==
Đurasović played for the Vogošća, Bosna, Leotar Trebinje and Zrinjski of the Basketball Championship of Bosnia and Herzegovina.

Also, he played abroad for Gießen 46ers (Germany), Polytekhnika-Halychyna (Ukraine), BBC Monthey (Switzerland) in Romania for Steaua CSM EximBank București and SCM U Craiova.

On September 21, 2017, Đurasović signed a contract for the Dynamic VIP PAY of the Basketball League of Serbia and the ABA League Second Division.

== Personal life ==
He is a younger brother of Nikola Đurasović who is also a basketball player.
