= Boban Stajić =

Macedonian basketball player

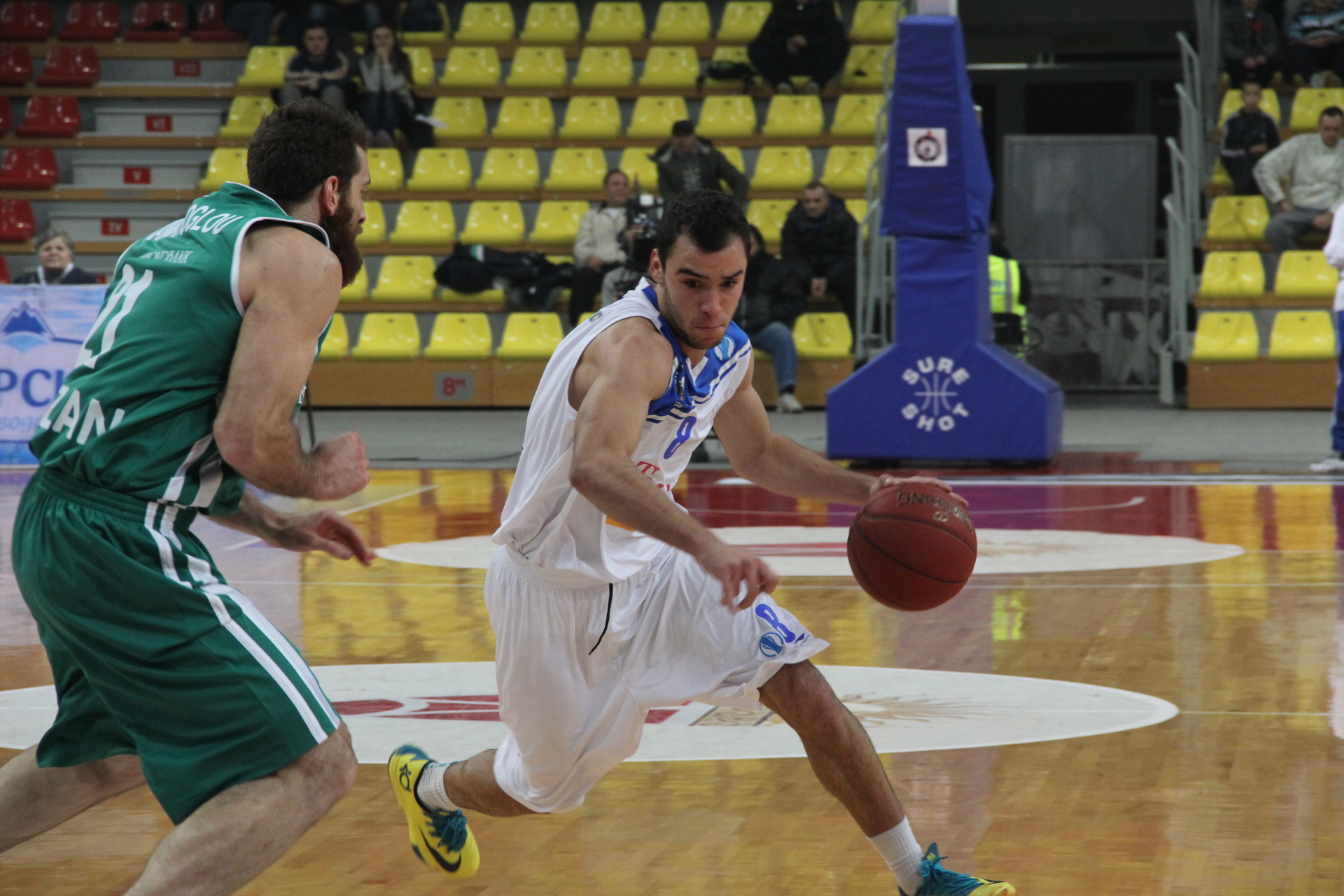
- in 2013 with MZT against UNICS Kazan

No. 4 – Kumanovo
- Position: Point guard
- League: Macedonian First League

Personal information
- Born: October 6, 1993 (age 33) Skopje, Macedonia
- Listed height: 1.85 m (6 ft 1 in)

Career information
- Playing career: 2011–present

Career history
- 2011–2013: Lirija
- 2013–2015: MZT Skopje
- 2015–2017: Feni Industries
- 2017: MZT Skopje
- 2017–2018: Kumanovo
- 2018–2019: Rabotnički
- 2019–2020: Kožuv
- 2020–2023: Pelister
- 2023–2024: Rabotnički
- 2024–2026: Pelister
- 2026–present: Kumanovo

Boban Stajić (born October 6, 1993) is a Macedonian professional basketball player who plays for Kumanovo. He was also member of U-20 Macedonia national basketball team.
