= Srdjan Božić =

Serbian basketball player

Srđan Božić
Personal information
- Born: April 22, 1984 (age 42) Užice, SR Serbia, SFR Yugoslavia
- Listed height: 1.96 m (6 ft 5 in)

Career information
- Playing career: 2004–2017
- Position: Guard

Career history
- 2004–2005: Prokuplje
- 2008: KFÍ
- 2008–2009: Slavija Istocno Sarajevo
- 2009: BGEU-RCOR Osipovichi
- 2009–2010: KK Šenčur
- 2010: Ultimejt Basket Prilep
- 2010–2011: Rabotnički
- 2011–2012: Ultimejt Basket Prilep
- 2013–2014: Sloga Societe Generale
- 2016–2017: Sloboda Užice

Srdjan Božić (born April 22, 1984) is a Serbian former professional basketball player.

== Career ==
In 2008, Božić signed with 1. deild karla club KFÍ. On 15 March 2008, he scored a season high 27 points in a 91–92 victory against Þór Þorlákshöfn.
