= Bojan Krstevski =

Macedonian basketball player

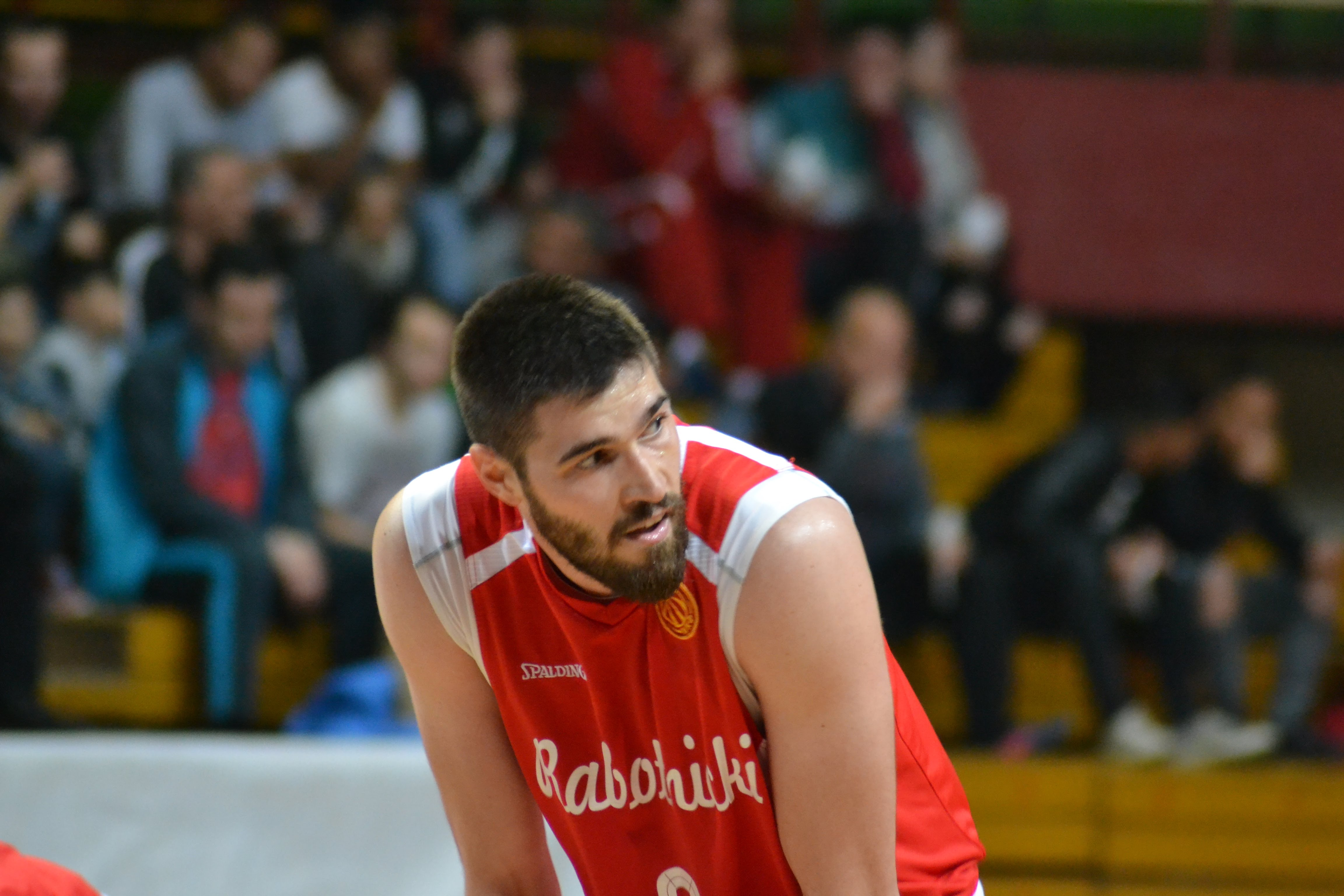
- in 2018

No. 0 – Kumanovo
- Position: Center
- League: Macedonian League

Personal information
- Born: 4 June 1989 (age 37) Skopje, SR Macedonia
- Listed height: 2.08 m (6 ft 10 in)
- Listed weight: 100 kg (220 lb)

Career history
- 2006–2007: Rabotnički
- 2007–2008: Centar
- 2008–2010: Vardar
- 2010–2012: Torus
- 2012–2015: Kavala
- 2015: Rabotnički
- 2016–2017: Kožuv
- 2017–2019: Rabotnički
- 2019–2026: MZT Skopje
- 2026–present: Kumanovo

Career highlights
- 7× Macedonian League champion (2018, 2021–2026); Greek 2nd Division champion (2015); 5× Macedonian Cup winner (2021, 2023–2026)

Bojan Krstevski (Macedonian: Бојан Крстевски; born 4 June 1989) is a Macedonian professional basketball player born in Skopje. He currently plays for Kumanovo. He is also a member of the North Macedonia men's national basketball team.
