= Milan Janjušević =

Serbian basketball player

Personal information
- Born: 9 April 1983 (age 43) Prijepolje, SR Serbia, SFR Yugoslavia
- Listed height: 2.13 m (7 ft 0 in)

Career information
- Playing career: 2003–2020
- Position: Small forward

Career history
- 2003–2006: Beopetrol
- 2007: Luka Koper
- 2007–2008: Radnički KG 06
- 2008–2009: Zdravlje Actavis
- 2009: Tamiš
- 2009–2010: Igokea
- 2010–2011: Crnokosa
- 2011–2012: Kumanovo
- 2012: ABA Strumica
- 2012–2013: CS Energia Rovinari
- 2013: Gradjanski
- 2013–2014: Crnokosa
- 2014–2015: Kožuv
- 2015–2016: HKK Zrinjski Mostar
- 2016: Gradjanski
- 2016–2017: Kožuv
- 2017–2018: Žarkovo
- 2018–2019: Mladost SP
- 2019–2020: Kolubara LA 2003

Milan Janjušević (born 9 April 1983) is a Serbian professional basketball player who last played for Kolubara LA 2003 of the Basketball League of Serbia.

He also played for Gradjanski of the Bosnian League.
