= Goran Dimitrijević (journalist) =

Serbian journalist and television presenter

- Горан Димитријевић
- Born: 1969; Kragujevac, SR Serbia, SFR Yugoslavia
- Occupations: Journalist; radio presenter; television presenter; translator
- Years active: 1994–present
- Known for: Long-time television presenter for B92

Goran Dimitrijević (Serbian Cyrillic: Горан Димитријевић; born 1969) is a Serbian journalist, radio and television presenter and translator, best known for being a long-time presenter for B92.

== Early life ==
Dimitrijević was born in 1969 in Kragujevac, and he graduated from the Faculty of Philology in the University of Belgrade.

== Career ==
During his early years, Dimitrijević worked for several youth magazines before joining B92. In 1994, he began working for Radio B92 and he primarily worked as a music show host and as a programme presenter. During the 1996–1997 protests, Dimitrijević and others opened the Radio B92 website and Dimitrijević primarily worked on the English version of the website. In 2001, he was invited to become a television presenter for B92, and shortly after he accepted that role. After 2005, he began working solely as a television presenter, journalist and translator. In 2017, Dimitrijević announced his departure from B92 on live television, and couple weeks after he began working for Prva. He worked for Prva until May 2020, when he was contacted by Slobodan Georgiev, the director of Newsmax Adria for Serbia, to join the newly founded television program which is broadcast on Nova S and is in ownership of United Media. Since then, he has been working as editor and presenter of the Pregled dana, together with Jelena Obućina, which is broadcast on Nova S.

During his 17 years of work for TV B92, he became a notable voice of television in Serbia, alongside his former television partner Živana Šaponja-Ilić. Dimitrijević worked as a correspondent for The Guardian and he participated in multiple investigation series about organised crime and corruption, particularly for BBC and the Serbian show Insajder. Besides his work on investigation series on BBC, he also worked on translations and synchronisations, and even till this day he works as a translator.
