= Sports Hall Kumanovo =

Macedonian sports venue

- Спортска сала Куманово
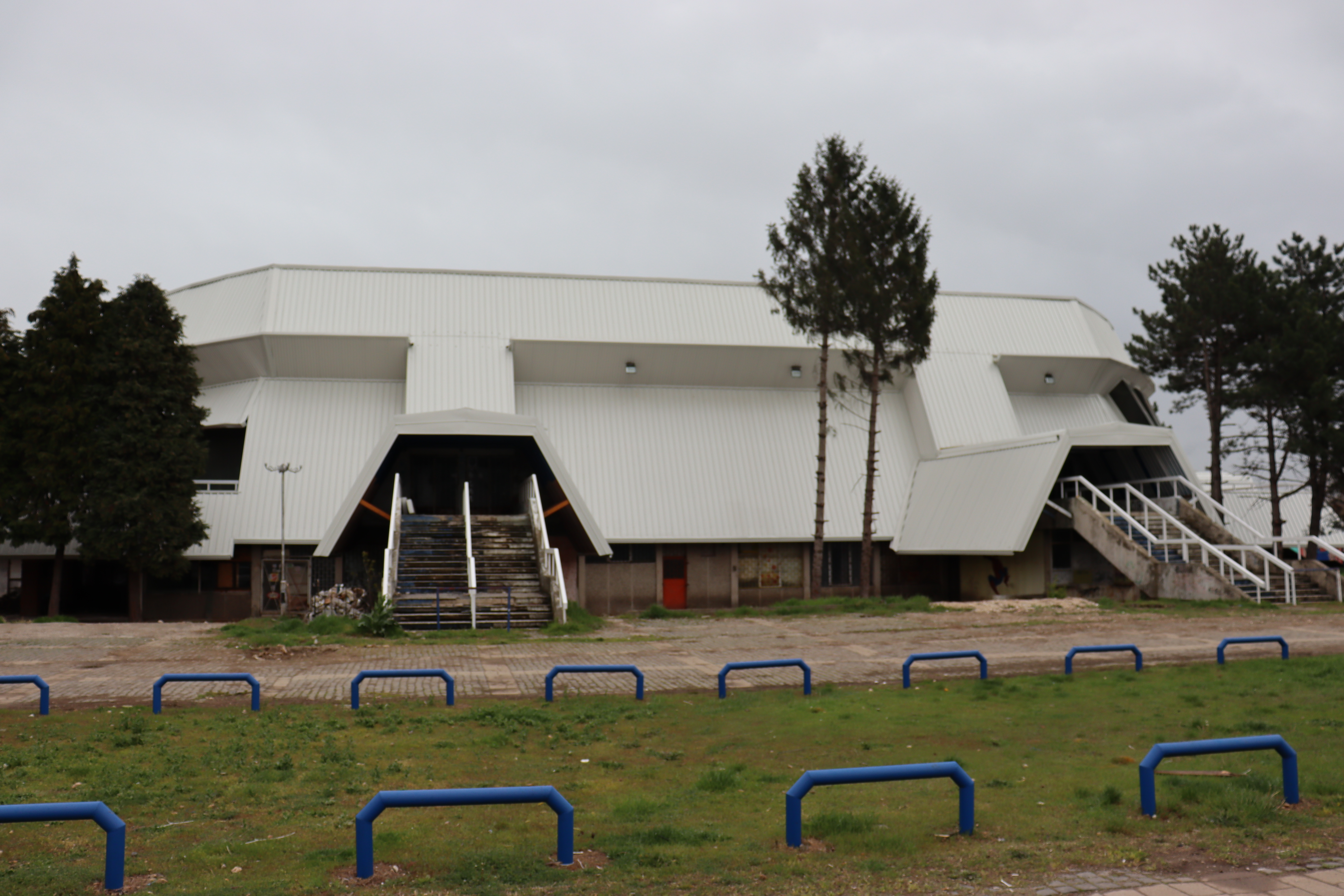
- Interactive map of Sports Hall Kumanovo
- Location: Kumanovo, North Macedonia
- Owner: Kumanovo Municipality
- Operator: Kumanovo Municipality
- Capacity: 4,000 (for handball) 4,000 (for basketball)

Construction
- Opened: 1980

Tenants
- KK Kumanovo; MRK Kumanovo; WHC Kumanovo·

Sports Hall Kumanovo (Macedonian: Спортска сала Куманово; Albanian: Salla e Sporteve Kumanovë) is an indoor sports venue located in Kumanovo, North Macedonia. The hall has a capacity of 4,000 seats and was built in 1980.

It is the biggest indoor sports hall in Kumanovo, where competitions of basketball, futsal, handball, volleyball and boxing matches are held.

== Events ==
Date/s	Type of Event/s	Name of Event/s	Est. attendance	Artist/s	Country of origin
1993, 7 October	Handball Match	1993/94 EHF Men's Cup Winners' Cup 1/8-finals	?	Sevro Kumanovo vs. TSV Bayer Dormagen	Macedonia; Germany
2006, 12 November	Concert	Municipal Liberation Day Party	?	Petar Grasho	Croatia
2009, 13 February	Concert	Humanitarian concert	?	Elena Ristevska, Lambe Alabakovski	Macedonia

== See also ==
- Kumani
- KK Kumanovo
- RK Kumanovo
