= Miladin Peković =

Serbian basketball player

Personal information
- Born: June 18, 1983 (age 43) Belgrade, SR Serbia, SFR Yugoslavia
- Listed height: 1.98 m (6 ft 6 in)

Career information
- NBA draft: 2005: undrafted
- Playing career: 2000–2019
- Position: Shooting guard

Career history
- 2001–2002: Radnički Belgrade
- 2002–2003: Avala Ada
- 2003–2004: Lavovi 063
- 2004–2006: Ergonom
- 2006–2007: Mega Ishrana
- 2007–2009: EWE Baskets Oldenburg
- 2009–2010: TBB Trier
- 2010–2011: Keravnos
- 2011: Proleter Naftagas
- 2012: BC Mureș
- 2012–2015: Kožuv
- 2015–2016: Feni Industries
- 2016–2017: Kumanovo
- 2017–2019: Kožuv

Miladin Peković (born June 18, 1983) is a Serbian retired professional basketball player.
