= Goran Dimitrijević (basketball) =

Macedonian basketball player

Personal information
- Born: 29 June 1970 (age 56) Macedonia
- Listed height: 1.87 m (6 ft 2 in)
- Position: Shooting guard

Career history
- 1993–1996: Kočani Delikates
- 1996–1998: Rabotnički
- 1998–2001: Kumanovo
- 2001–2002: Vardar
- 2002–2003: Kumanovo

Goran Dimitrijević (born 29 June 1970) is a Macedonian former professional basketball shooting guard who last played for Kumanovo.
