= Paul Culbertson (basketball) =

American basketball player

Personal information
- Born: November 12, 1975 (age 51) Roosevelt, New York, U.S.
- Listed height: 6 ft 4 in (1.93 m)
- Listed weight: 220 lb (100 kg)

Career information
- High school: Roosevelt (Hyde Park, New York)
- College: Riverside CC (1994–1996); Nevada (1996–1998)
- NBA draft: 1998: undrafted
- Playing career: 1998–2004
- Position: Small forward / shooting guard

Career history
- 1998: Hapoel Holon
- 1999–2000: Black Hills Gold
- 2000: Fargo-Moorhead Beez
- 2000–2001: Winnipeg Cyclone
- 2001–2002: Rabotnički
- 2002–2003: Yakima Sun Kings
- 2003–2004: Rabotnički

Paul Culbertson (born November 12, 1975) is an American former professional basketball player who played college basketball for Nevada.
