= Mirko Kovač (basketball) =

Serbian basketball player

Free agent
- Position: Small forward

Personal information
- Born: 1 March 1983 (age 43) Belgrade, SR Serbia, SFR Yugoslavia
- Listed height: 6 ft 6.5 in (1.99 m)
- Listed weight: 207 lb (94 kg)

Career information
- NBA draft: 2005: undrafted
- Playing career: 2000–present

Career history
- 2000–2001: Partizan
- 2001–2003: OKK Beograd
- 2003–2005: Partizan
- 2005: Atlas Banka Novi Beograd
- 2005–2006: OKK Beograd
- 2006–2009: Crvena zvezda
- 2010: AZS Koszalin
- 2010–2011: APOEL
- 2011–2012: OKK Beograd
- 2013–2014: SCM CSU Craiova
- 2014–2015: CSU Pitești
- 2016: Koroivos
- 2017: Timba Timișoara
- 2017–2019: Kumanovo

Career highlights
- Cypriot Cup champion (2011); Polish Cup champion (2010); Serbian League champion (2004)
Medals
Men's basketball
Representing FR Yugoslavia
European Championship for Cadets
Gold medal – first place	1999 Slovenia	U16 Team

Mirko Kovač (born 1 March 1983) is a Serbian professional basketball player who last played for Kumanovo of the Macedonian First League. He was a member of the Serbian cadet and junior national team. He won cadet European Championship '99. He was 3rd MVP Serbian League and best 3 points shooter 2006. Best 3 points shooter in Romanian League 2014.
