= Nikola Đurasović =

Bosnian basketball player (born 1983)

Nikola Djurasović
No. 10 – Leotar
- Position: Small forward
- League: Bosnia and Herzegovina Championship

Personal information
- Born: 8 August 1983 (age 43) Dubrovnik, SR Croatia, SFR Yugoslavia
- Listed height: 1.99 m (6 ft 6 in)

Career information
- NBA draft: 2005: undrafted
- Playing career: 1999–present

Career history
- 1999–2007: Leotar Trebinje
- 2007: Slavija Sarajevo
- 2007–2009: Borac Banja Luka
- 2009–2011: Leotar Trebninje
- 2011–2012: ENAD Ayiou Dometiou
- 2012–2013: CSU Craiova
- 2013–2015: Spars Sarajevo
- 2015–2016: Swisslion Leotar Trebinje
- 2016–2017: Kožuv
- 2017–2020: Union Rennes Basket 35
- 2020–present: Leotar Trebninje

Nikola Djurasović (born 8 August 1983) is a Bosnian professional basketball player for Leotar of the Bosnia and Herzegovina Championship.

Djurasović played for Union Rennes Basket 35 from 2017 to 2020. He signed with Leotar in 2020 and averaged 10.2 points, 4.5 rebounds, 1.6 assists and 1.0 steal per game. Djurasović re-signed with the team on 5 September 2021.
