= KK Kožuv =

KK Kozhuv
- Leagues: Macedonian First League
- Founded: 1955
- Arena: 26th April Hall
- Capacity: 1,600 seats
- Location: Gevgelija, North Macedonia
- Team colors: Red and White
- Head coach: Miodrag Todorovikj
- Website: kozuv.com.mk
Home	Away

KK Kozhuv (Macedonian: КК Кожув) Gevgelija is a basketball club based in Gevgelija, North Macedonia. They currently play in the Macedonian First League.

== History ==
The club was founded in 1955.

Kozhuv's biggest success came in 2013, they made the Macedonian First League playoff final but ended up losing against MZT Skopje Aerodrom. Kozhuv reached the Macedonian Cup Final in 2015. They lost the final match against the heavy-weight Rabotnichki 66-74 .Kozhuv also competed in BIBL league for 6 seasons. They reached the 3rd place twice in seasons 2015 and 2016. Since its second top-flight season in 2012, the team from the border town has also participated in the supranational Balkan League, a position it has consistently held ever since. After two rather moderately successful campaigns, it remained undefeated in the 2014/15 preliminary round and qualified directly for the semifinals in the second group stage, losing to eventual champions KB Sigal Prishtina on aggregate. In the following Balkan League season, the team lost to KK Mornar Bar in the 2016 semifinals. In the season 2019-20 KK Blokotehna fused in KK Kozhuv. All the players joined Kozhuv at this season.

As Blokotehna Gevgelija in the season 2017/2018 they played in the semifinals with Levski Lukoil finishing 4th.Next season in 2019, Blokotehna won BIBL League trophy beating Teuta in the Final. In season 2018/19 they were hosts of the domestic cup and they played in the Final against Rabotnicki. They made it to the semi-finals in the domestic Championship play-off.

== Home Ground ==
Sports Hall 26 th of April is the venue for KK Kozhuf home games.

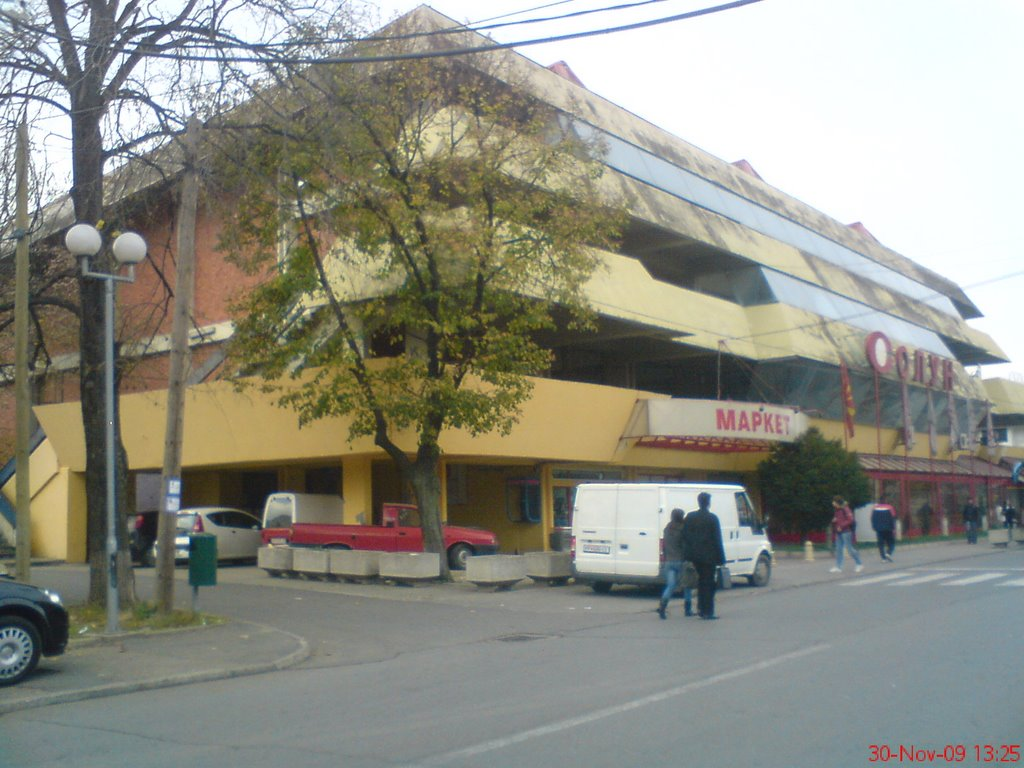
Sports Hall "26th April"

== BIBL League Seasons ==
- 2013: (4-4) 7th
- 2014: (5-11) 9th
- 2015: (13-3) 3rd
- 2016: (6-8) 3rd
- 2017: (9-9) 5th
- 2018: (10-4) 4th
- 2019: (11-3)

== Honours ==
=== Domestic Achievements ===
- Macedonian League Finalist - 2013
- Macedonian Cup Finalist - 2015

European

- BIBL Champions 2019

=== International Achievements ===
- Mavroskoufia Basketball Tournament - 2013, 2014

== Current roster ==
KK Kožuv roster
Players
Coaches

Pos.	No.	Nat.	Name	Ht.		Age
SG	4	(Serbia)	Simić, Stefan	1.96 m (6 ft 5 in)		30 – 3 January 1996
PG	5	(North Macedonia)	Bukrshliev, Riste	1.84 m (6 ft 0 in)		19 – 30 April 2007
G	6	(North Macedonia)	Ichev, Andrej	1.92 m (6 ft 4 in)		20 – 4 April 2006
F	7	(United States)	Armstrong, Terry	2.01 m (6 ft 7 in)	93 kg (205 lb)	26 – 16 July 2000
G	8	(North Macedonia)	Kuzmanov, Jordan	1.90 m (6 ft 3 in)		20 – 19 March 2006
G	9	(North Macedonia)	Bojčev, Nikola	1.92 m (6 ft 4 in)		22 – 21 August 2004
F	12	(North Macedonia)	Kolev, Aleksandar	1.95 m (6 ft 5 in)		26 – 5 May 2000
SF	14	(North Macedonia)	Kolev, Ilija	1.98 m (6 ft 6 in)		30 – 2 August 1996
PG	88	(North Macedonia)	Stojanov, Mihail	1.84 m (6 ft 0 in)		21 – 19 November 2004
F	35	(United States)	Burris, Nigel	2.01 m (6 ft 7 in)		23 – 23 March 2003
SF	88	(North Macedonia)	Krstevski, Damjan	1.97 m (6 ft 6 in)		27 – 30 June 1999

Head coach

- (North Macedonia) Miodrag Todorović

Assistant coach(es)

- (North Macedonia) Ilija Eftimov

Legend

- (C) Team captain
- (L) On loan
- Injured

- Roster
Updated: 2026-03-08

=== Depth chart ===
Pos.	Starting 5	Bench 1	Bench 2
C	Nigel Burris	Aleksandar Kolev
PF	Ilija Kolev	Jordan Kuzmanov
SF	Terry Armstrong	Nikola Bojčev
SG	Damjan Krstevski	Andrej Ichev
PG	Stefan Simić	Mihail Stojanov	Riste Bukrshliev

== Former players ==
- (North Macedonia) Dimitar Karadzovski
- (North Macedonia) Pero Blazevski
- (North Macedonia) Kiril Pavlovski
- (North Macedonia) Darko Radulović
- (North Macedonia) Zlatko Gocevski
- (North Macedonia) Vladimir Brčkov
- (North Macedonia) Aleksandar Šterjov
- (North Macedonia) Igor Penov
- (North Macedonia) Stojan Gjuroski
- (North Macedonia) Kiril Toshev
- (North Macedonia) Ranko Mamuzić
- (North Macedonia) Nikola Karakolev
- (North Macedonia) Daniel Nacevski
- (North Macedonia) Ivica Dimcevski
- (North Macedonia) Martin Shalev
- (North Macedonia) Bojan Krstevski
- (North Macedonia) Bojan Trajkovski
- (North Macedonia) Boban Stajic
- (North Macedonia) Predrag Pajic
- (North Macedonia) Jetmir Zeqiri
- (North Macedonia) Dimitar Mirakovski
- (North Macedonia) Vojče Lefkoski
- (North Macedonia) Marko Simonovski
- (Serbia) Ratko Varda
- (Serbia) Miladin Peković
- (Serbia) Igor Mijajlović
- (Serbia) Vladimir Filipović
- (Serbia) Milivoje Mijović
- (Serbia) Filip Šepa
- (Serbia) Andreja Stevanović
- (Serbia) Slobodan Božović
- (Serbia) Slobodan Dunđerski
- (Serbia) Milan Janjušević
- (Serbia) Slaven Čupković
- (Serbia) Vladimir Ivelja
- (Serbia) Nikola Djurasović
- (Serbia) Uros Lukovic
- (Bosnia and Herzegovina) Draško Albijanić
- (Bosnia and Herzegovina) Aleksej Nešović
- (United States) Kenyon McNeail
- (United States) Larry Hall
- (United States) Jason Carter
- (United States) Austin Dufault
- (United States) Brandon Penn
- (United States) Ryan White
- (Croatia) Fran Pilepić
