= KK Rabotnički =

Rabotnički
- Nickname: Шпедитери (Forwarders)
- Leagues: Macedonian League
- Founded: 1946
- Arena: Lazar Lečić Arena
- Capacity: 1 150
- Location: Skopje, North Macedonia
- Team colors: Red and White
- President: Branko Radevski
- Head coach: Vladimir Mirkovski
- Championships: 15 Championships of Macedonia; 10 Macedonian Cups; 2 Macedonian Super Cups
| Home | Away |

KK Rabotnički (Macedonian: КК Работнички) is a basketball club based in Skopje, North Macedonia. They currently play in the Macedonian First League. The club has won the Macedonian championship 15 times and the Macedonian Cup 10 times.

== History ==
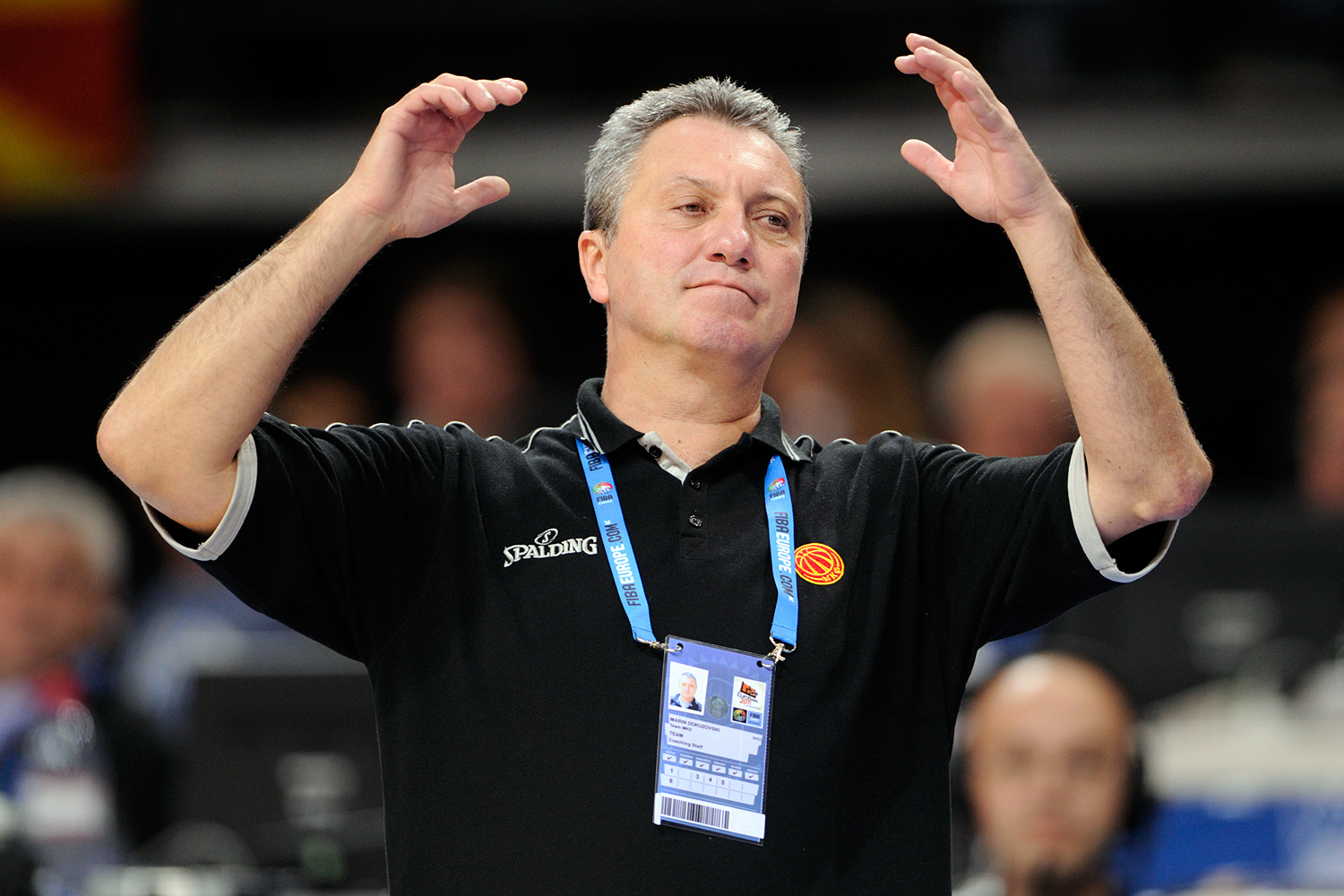
Marin Dokuzovski

The club was founded in 1946 in Skopje. Rabotnicki was founded thanks to Slavko Matovski who "gathered" a group of young enthusiasts and taught them the secrets of this sport. On August 2 and 3, 1946, the First Basketball Championship in Macedonia was held, on a modified field at the Skopje City Stadium, which actually served as qualifications for the Yugoslav Basketball League for the 1946 season.That championship was within the framework of the Second Physical Education Meeting and the basketball clubs that participated were Makedonija (in less than a year, after the merger of several sports clubs, the club was reorganized into Vardar), Rabotnicki, and Vancho Prke from Shtip. Last time, Rabotnicki defeated Vancho Prke with 30:8. In the last match, Rabotnicki lost to Macedonia with 30:18 and thus Macedonia gained the right to participate in the second season (first season with clubs) of the elite league.At that time, Slavko Matovski, Dragan Lukoski - Adzija, Trajan Ivanovski, Boris Anastasov, Atanas Radevski, Vojce Dimitrovski, Ilija Kovkarov and others played for Rabotnicki. Since the club's founding, the men's team of Rabotnicki has included Nikola Matovski, Lazarevic, Hristovski, Stojanovski, Dimovski, Stefan and Toso Todorovski, Dimovski, Atanasovski for many years.After becoming the runner-up in 1946, Rabotnicki went on to win seven Macedonian Championships (1947, 1948, 1949, 1950, 1951, 1952 and 1953). In 1953, they managed to qualify for the elite Yugoslav Basketball League.Rabotnicki competed in the First Federal League – East, but only for one season. From that time, it is worth mentioning the third place in the State Youth Championship in 1957.A new generation was being born (Knjazev, Fišić, N.Matovski, Drnkov, Masten, Mirovski, Lečić...) which won the Macedonian Championship for the 8th time in 1961 and only in 1964 did it win the right to once again join the elite First Federal League.In 1964 under the leadership of Lazar Lečić, KK Rabotnički became a member of the First Federal Basketball League. From 1963 to 1970, J. Lukovski and S. Andonovski played for the former Yugoslavia national team, and in the period from 1970 to 1977: Bocevski, Radosavljević, Georgievski, Kovačević and Radulović, and at the same time Blagoja Georgievski is one of the most prominent athletes of the Macedonia and one of the few Macedonian athletes who holds the highest sports title – Meritorious Athlete of the former Yugoslavia. In the 1975–1976 season, he reached the semifinals of the European Cup Winners Cup.Rabotnicki spent the 1978/79 season in the Second Yugoslav League and then became the champion, while the following season, Rabotnicki returned to the First Yugoslav League. That 1979/80 season, the head of the coaching staff was Lazar Lečić, and the head coach was Aleksandar Knjazev. The team captain was Janko Lukovski.The other players were Blagoja Georgievski, Stevan Geshovski, Delcho Staninov and Marin Dokuzovski who played from 1978 to 1989 . Rabotnicki competed in the Yugoslav League on a regular basis until 1992. They have never won a Federal championship but they were finalists in the Federal Yugoslav Cup on two occasions in 1976 and 1983.

Godel Era

Since the Macedonian Republic League became the new Macedonian First League, Rabotnički have been the most successful Macedonian basketball team of all time, winning a record 15 league titles and 9 national cups. The basketball clubs from the Republic continued their competitions within the Republic itself. For the 1992/93 State Championship from the two basketball leagues – East and West, the first four teams from both groups secured participation in the First Mac-Partner Basketball League.The club played as Godel Rabotnicki, under the auspices of the leather company "Godel", the club won seven Championship titles in 1993, 1994, 1995, 1996, 1997, 1998, 1999, as well as three Cup titles in 1993, 1994, 1998. In the 1999/00 season, for the first time since the Macedonian First League existed, the team did not win a title, as it lost to Gostivar's Nicole Ferth in the final, shattering the myth of the invincible "giant".

Fershped Era

In the 2000/01 season, Rabotnicki was without a general sponsor, but that did not prevent them from winning the Championship. For the following season, "Fersped" came as the club's new sponsor. That same season, Fersped Rabotnicki won the Championship again, in the final against KK Kumanovo.In the 2002/03 season, Feršped Rabotnicki defeated Polo Trade in the league final, while in the 2003 Cup they defeated MZT Skopje. In the 2003/04 season, Feršped again won the double crown, against MZT in the Championship, and against Nemetali Ogražden in the Cup.In the same season, in the South Conference of the FIBA Europe Cup, Rabotnicki became the vice-champion. The 2004/05 and 2005/06 seasons were marked by a rivalry with Vardar. During these two seasons, both teams played in all the League and Cup finals, all in favor of Feršped Rabotnicki.The following season in the League, Rabotnicki became the runner-up, losing in the final to Strumica 2005, while in the Cup 2007 they reached the final. The club received a wild card to participate in the Adriatic League for the 2007–08 season, but later withdrew from the competition. In the 2007/08 season, Rabotnicki reached the semifinals of the Championship and the Cup. In the 2008/09 season, Feršped Rabotnicki won the domestic Championship, became the runner-up in the Balkan League, while in the Cup they reached the semifinals.

Recent Seasons

Since the 2009/10 season, Rabotnicki has been without a general sponsor. In the domestic championship, it finished in sixth place in the Super League, and in the 2010 Cup, it reached the quarterfinals. In the Balkan League, it only survived until the first phase of the competition.In the 2010/2011 season, the new general sponsor of the club was "KUBUS", with which the 2011 Cup was won, while in the Championship the second place was won, but after two seasons, the sponsor left. Since the 2011/2012 season, the main sponsor of the club is the Municipality of Centar and for the 2012/2013 season, the Rabotnicki basketball club was transformed into a Joint Stock Company.In the 2013/14 season, Rabotnicki won second place in the Championship. The following season, Rabotnicki won the 2015 Macedonian Cup. In the 2014/2015 Championship, Rabotnicki was eliminated in the semifinals by Kumanovo 2009. In 2015, Rabotnicki competed in the renewed Supercup, becoming the runner-up in that edition.The same season, they reached the quarterfinals of the Championship and the Cup. Rabotnicki reached the semifinals of the 2017 Cup and the Championship in the 2016/17 season. In the 2017/18 season, Rabotnicki was the runner-up in the 2018 Cup, while in the Championship, after a break of nine years, Rabotnicki were champions again. The club became the first club to reach a tenth Cup title, after winning the 2019 edition. Later in June, Rabotnicki were defeated in the Championship final.

== Home Ground ==
Rabotnichki currently play as a host at SRC Kale hall.Before they used to play in their own City Park Basketball hall.The City Park hall is under reconstruction.

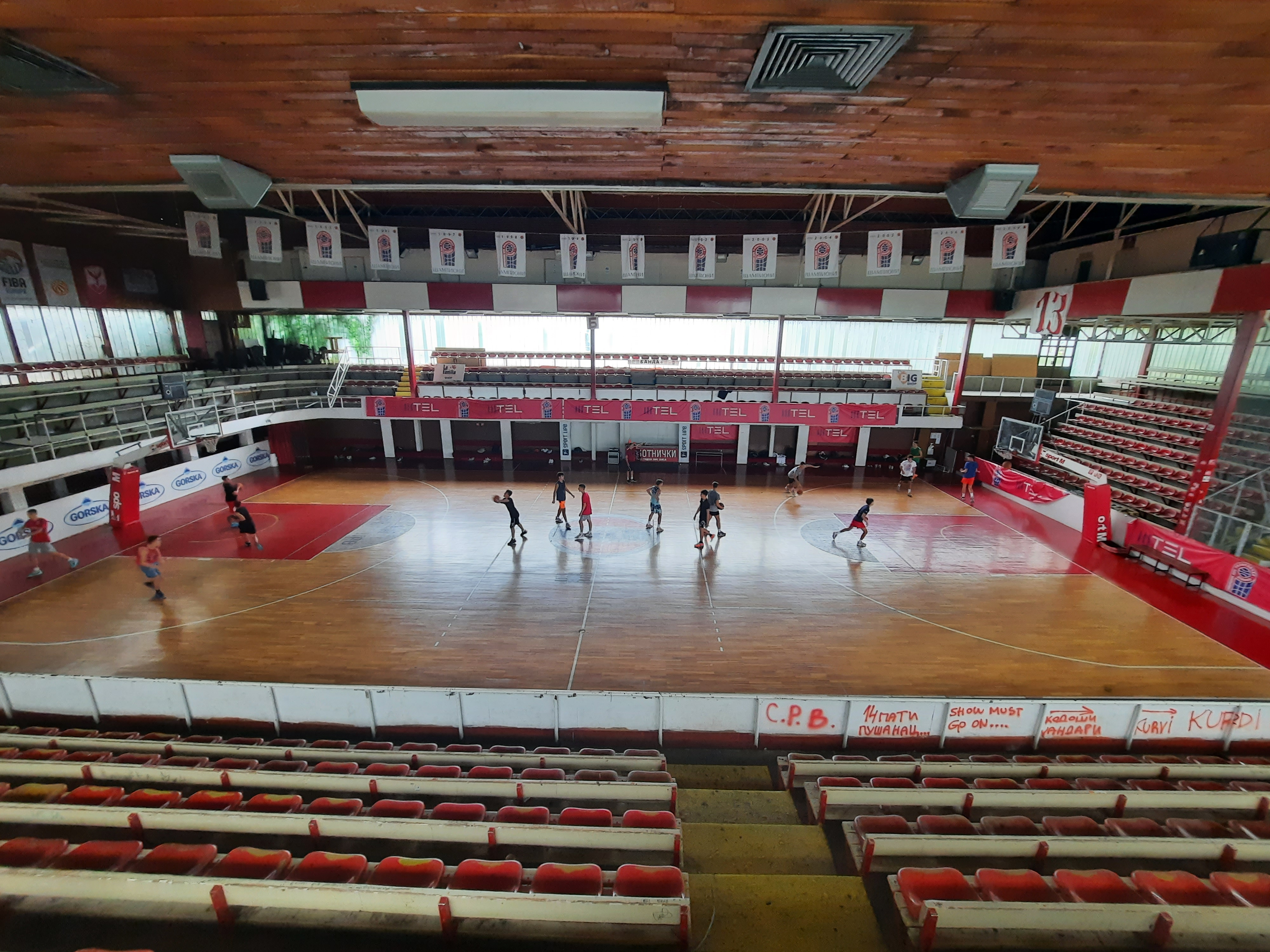

== Honours ==
=== Domestic competitions ===
Macedonian Republic League

- Winners (9): 1948, 1949, 1950, 1951, 1952, 1960, 1961, 1963, 1964

Macedonian Republic Cup

- Winners (4): 1976, 1983, 1985, 1988

Macedonian League

- Winners (15): 1993, 1994, 1995, 1996, 1997, 1998, 1999, 2001, 2002, 2003, 2004, 2005, 2006, 2009, 2018

Macedonian Cup

- Winners (10): 1993, 1994, 1998, 2003, 2004, 2005, 2006, 2011, 2015, 2019

Macedonian Super Cup Winner

- Winners (2): 2001, 2011

=== European achievements ===
FIBA Saporta Cup

- Semi-finalist (1): 1975–76

FIBA Europe Conference South

- Runners-up (1): 2003–04

Balkan International Basketball League

- Runners-up (1): 2008–09

== Players ==
=== Roster 2026-2027 ===
Rabotnički roster
Players
Coaches

| Pos. | No. | Nat. | Name | Ht. | Age |
|---|---|---|---|---|---|
| F | 2 | (United States) | Ellingsworth, Jaxon | 2.06 m (6 ft 9 in) |
| PF | 5 | (North Macedonia) | Rexha, Fatjon | 1.97 m (6 ft 6 in) | 25 – 30 January 2001 |
| SG | 8 | (North Macedonia) | Robev, Damjan | 1.94 m (6 ft 4 in) | 29 – 10 April 1997 |
| SG | 9 | (North Macedonia) | Nakov, Filip | 1.94 m (6 ft 4 in) | 23 – 9 September 2003 |
| PG | 10 | (North Macedonia) | Ilijev, Stefan | 1.85 m (6 ft 1 in) | 17 – 1 January 2009 |
| SG | 12 | (North Macedonia) | Petrovski, Luka | 1.95 m (6 ft 5 in) | 30 – 20 October 1996 |
| PG | 20 | (North Macedonia) | Nikolov, Kristijan | 1.87 m (6 ft 2 in) | 30 – 5 October 1996 |
| C | 33 | (Croatia) | Rikić, Robert | 2.19 m (7 ft 2 in) | 36 – 29 April 1990 |
| SG | 25 | (North Macedonia) | Efremovski, Viktor (C) | 1.94 m (6 ft 4 in) | 28 – 21 October 1998 |
| F | 32 | (North Macedonia) | Trajanov, Atanasij | 2.00 m (6 ft 7 in) | 20 – 28 January 2006 |
| PG | 40 | (Hungary) | Govens, Darrin | 1.85 m (6 ft 1 in) | 38 – 5 January 1988 |

Head coach

(North Macedonia) Vladimir Mirkovski

Assistant coach(es)

- (North Macedonia) Dushko Jovchevski

Physiotherapist(s)

- (North Macedonia) Andrej Jovanovski

Team manager

- (North Macedonia) Branko Radevski

Legend

- (C) Team captain
- Injured

- Roster
Updated: 29 July 2026

=== Depth chart ===
| Pos. | Starting 5 | Bench 1 | Bench 2 |
|---|---|---|---|
| C | Robert Rikić | Fatjon Rexha |
| PF | Jaxon Ellingsworth | Atanasij Trajanov |
| SF | Damjan Robev | Luka Petrovski |
| SG | Viktor Efremovski | Filip Nakov |
| PG | Darrin Govens | Kristijan Nikolov | Stefan Ilijev |

=== Retired numbers ===
KK Rabotnički retired numbers
| No. | Player | Position | Tenure |
|---|---|---|---|
| 13 | Blagoja Georgievski | PG | 1968–1984 |

== KK Rabotnicki in European competitions ==
In their rich European history KK Rabotnicki competed in many European competitions. Their most successful period was in the 1990s. They competed for eleven seasons in four different cups.

BIBL League Seasons

- 2009: (7-5) 2nd
- 2010: (3-7) 9th

Seasons and results of Rabotnicki in Europe:

1975 FIBA European Cup

| Round | Team | Home | Away |
|---|---|---|---|
| Group stage | (Greece) Olympiacos | 90–79 | 91–71 |
| Group stage | (Bulgaria) CSKA Sofia | 117–88 | 90–84 |
| Group stage | (France) Tours Basket | 107–90 | 99–83 |
| Semi-final | (Italy) Olimpia Milano | 104–89 | 90–67 |

1993 Saporta Cup

| Round | Team | Home | Away |
|---|---|---|---|
| Round 1 | (Netherlands) BV Den Helder | 85–62 | 92–76 |
| Group stage | (Spain) Saski Baskonia | 102–97 | 113–90 |
| Group stage | (Turkey) Tofaş | 109–107 | 92–87 |
| Group stage | (Slovenia) Olimpija Ljubljana | 66–88 | 89–77 |
| Group stage | (Switzerland) Bellinzona | 92–94 | 87–70 |
| Group stage | (Croatia) Split | 85–91 | 82–74 |

1995 FIBA European League

| Round | Team | Home | Away |
|---|---|---|---|
| Round 1 | (Ukraine) Budivelnyk | 65–64 | 83–69 |

1995 Europe Champions Cup

| Round | Team | Home | Away |
|---|---|---|---|
| Qualif.Round | (Bosnia and Herzegovina) HKK Brotnjo | 78–64 | 76–59 |

1996 FIBA Saporta Cup

| Round | Team | Home | Away |
|---|---|---|---|
| Group stage | (Latvia) Rīgas ASK | 84–97 | 99–80 |
| Group stage | (Poland) Włocławek | 86–88 | 82–76 |
| Group stage | (Italy) Scavolini Pesaro | 78–71 | 95–77 |
| Group stage | (Slovenia) Hopsi Polzela | 89–91 | 74–66 |
| Group stage | (Turkey) Fenerbahçe | 78–84 | 90–61 |

1997 FIBA Saporta Cup

| Round | Team | Home | Away |
|---|---|---|---|
| Group stage | (Finland) ToPo Helsinki | 80–81 | 85–55 |
| Group stage | (Spain) Joventut Badalona | 55–70 | 105–72 |
| Group stage | (Ukraine) BIPA-Moda | 57–77 | 78–63 |
| Group stage | (Turkey) Tofaş | 76–77 | 73–47 |
| Group stage | (Lithuania) Žemaitijos Lokiai | 78–88 | 86–70 |

1999 FIBA Saporta Cup

| Round | Team | Home | Away |
|---|---|---|---|
| Group stage | (Bosnia and Herzegovina) Bosna | 51–82 | 59–52 |
| Group stage | (Spain) TAU Cerámica | 57–73 | 70–49 |
| Group stage | (France) PSG Racing | 57–70 | 83–43 |
| Group stage | (Portugal) Illiabum Clube | 68–76 | 67–68 |
| Group stage | (Poland) Znicz Pruszków | 64–65 | 84–41 |

2000 Radivoj Korać Cup

| Round | Team | Home | Away |
|---|---|---|---|
| Qualif.Round | (Bosnia and Herzegovina) Igokea | 63–71 | 70–70 |

2002 FIBA Euro Challenge

| Round | Team | Home | Away |
|---|---|---|---|
| Group stage | (Greece) Peristeri | 59–72 | 85–72 |
| Group stage | (Serbia) NIS Vojvodina | 81–83 | 102–77 |
| Group stage | (Turkey) Pinar Karşıyaka | 66–96 | 99–91 |
| Group stage | (Israel) Hapoel Jerusalem | 89–90 | 90–64 |
| Group stage | (Bulgaria) Yambolgaz-92 | 75–69 | 73–85 |

2003 FIBA Euro Challenge – South Conference

| Round | Team | Home | Away |
|---|---|---|---|
| Group stage | (Turkey) Fenerbahçe | 91–87 | 80–65 |
| Group stage | (Romania) CSU Ploiești | 75–66 | 60–46 |
| Group stage | (Cyprus) APOEL Nicosia | 81–77 | 93–100 |
| Semi-final | (Cyprus) Keravnos | 96–75 | |
| Final | (Turkey) Tuborg Izmir | 78–80 | |

2004 FIBA Euro Challenge

| Round | Team | Home | Away |
|---|---|---|---|
| Group stage | (Russia) UNICS Kazan | 95–99 | 87–53 |
| Group stage | (Czech Republic) Nymburk | 102–86 | 84–60 |
| Group stage | (Israel) Hapoel Galil Elyon | 97–109 | 92–87 |
| Group stage | (Turkey) Fenerbahçe | 67–79 | 109–60 |
| Group stage | (Bulgaria) CSKA Sofia | 82–81 | 84–97 |
| Group stage | (Ukraine) Kyiv Basket | 62–88 | 102–73 |

2017 FIBA Europe Cup

| Round | Team | Home | Away |
|---|---|---|---|
| Qualifying Round 1 | (Russia) Parma Basket | 73–95 | 88–63 |

2024 FIBA Europe Cup

| Round | Team | Home | Away |
|---|---|---|---|
| Group stage | (Azerbaijan) Sabah BC | - | 81–83 |
| Group stage | (Romania) CS Rapid București | - | 57–87 |
| Group stage | (Netherlands) Donar | - | 62-65 |

== Rivalries ==
KK Rabotnički Skopje's long standing city rival is MZT Skopje, the other basketball club in Macedonia. They also have supporters in the capital city named Family Aerodrom. The rivalry started after the Independence of Macedonia, and the matches between these rivals have been labeled as the Eternal derby.

| Team | Mutual score |
|---|---|
| Rabotnički | 93 |
| MZT Skopje Aerodrom | 82 |

== Notable players ==
- (North Macedonia) Goran Veselinovski
- (North Macedonia) Toni Simić
- (North Macedonia) Gjorgji Čekovski
- (North Macedonia) Goran Samardziev
- (North Macedonia) Dime Tasovski
- (North Macedonia) Aleksandar Dimitrovski
- (North Macedonia) Pero Blazevski
- (North Macedonia) Ognen Stojanovski
- (North Macedonia) Pero Antić
- (North Macedonia) Bojan Trajkovski
- (North Macedonia) Dimitar Mirakovski
- (North Macedonia) Aleksandar Kostoski
- (North Macedonia) Dušan Bocevski
- (North Macedonia) Jordančo Davitkov
- (North Macedonia) Gjorgji Knjazev
- (North Macedonia) Dejan Jovanovski
- (North Macedonia) Mirza Kurtović
- (North Macedonia) Todor Gečevski
- (North Macedonia) Srdjan Stanković
- (North Macedonia) Marjan Gjurov
- (North Macedonia) Riste Stefanov
- (North Macedonia) Goce Gerasimovski
- (North Macedonia) Vlatko Vladičevski
- (North Macedonia) Vrbica Stefanov
- (North Macedonia) Darko Sokolov
- (North Macedonia) Budimir Jolović
- (North Macedonia) Emil Rajković
- (North Macedonia) Dimitar Karadžovski
- (North Macedonia) Vlado Ilievski
- (North Macedonia) Toni Grnčarov
- (North Macedonia) Vasko Najkov
- (North Macedonia) Marjan Srbinovski
- (North Macedonia) Jane Petrovski
- (North Macedonia) Marko Simonovski
- (North Macedonia) Aleksandar Ugrinoski
- (North Macedonia) Eftim Bogoev
- (North Macedonia) Boris Nešović
- (North Macedonia) Đorđe Vojnović
- (North Macedonia) Goran Dimitrijević
- (North Macedonia) Enes Hadžibulić
- (North Macedonia) Ivica Dimčevski
- (North Macedonia) Bojan Krstevski
- (North Macedonia) Kiril Nikolovski
- (North Macedonia) Boban Stajić
- (Serbia) Marko Ivanović
- (Serbia) Zoran Jovanović
- (Serbia) Miško Marić
- (Serbia) Dragoljub Vidačić
- (Serbia) Dragan Smiljanić
- (Serbia) Slobodan Kanjevac
- (Serbia) Vladimir Dragutinović
- (Serbia) Vladimir Filipović
- (Serbia) Miljan Pavković
- (Serbia) Vladimir Popović
- (Serbia) Srdjan Božić
- (Serbia) Predrag Joksimović
- (Serbia) Aleksandar Mitrović
- (United States) Kendrick Johnson
- (United States) Marcus Ginyard
- (United States) Russell Robinson
- (United States) Sean Evans
- (United States) Paul Culbertson
- (United States) Antoni Wyche
- (United States) William Coleman
- (United States) Phil Zevenbergen
- (United States) Hameed Kashif
- (United States) Gary Ware
- (United States) Vernand Hollins
- (United States) Vincent King
- (Montenegro) Igor Bijelić
- (Montenegro) Danilo Mitrović
- (Montenegro) Stojan Ivković
- (Montenegro) Luka Pavićević
- (Somalia) Mohamed Abukar
- (Bosnia and Herzegovina) Goran Ikonić
- (Bosnia and Herzegovina) Bariša Krasić
- (Turkey) Bora Paçun
- (Sweden) Rudy Mbemba
- (Canada) William Njoku
- (Bulgaria) Chavdar Kostov
- (Socialist Republic of Macedonia) Lazar Lečić
- (Socialist Republic of Macedonia) Predrag Bogosavljev
- (Socialist Republic of Macedonia) Nikola Matovski
- (Socialist Republic of Macedonia) Slavko Matovski
- (Socialist Republic of Macedonia) Blagoja Georgievski
- (Socialist Republic of Macedonia) Janko Lukovski
- (Socialist Republic of Macedonia) Hristo Gjorgjevski
- (Socialist Republic of Macedonia) Stefan Todorovski
- (Socialist Republic of Macedonia) Slobodan Bocevski
- (Socialist Republic of Macedonia) Aleksandar Knjazev
- (Socialist Republic of Macedonia) Dragan Radosavljević
- (Socialist Republic of Macedonia) Steruli Andonovski
- (Socialist Republic of Macedonia) Stevan Gešovski
- (Socialist Republic of Macedonia) Boban Samardžiski
- (Socialist Republic of Macedonia) Branko Kacarski
- (Socialist Republic of Macedonia) Kosta Hadžitrifunov
- (Socialist Republic of Macedonia) Borče Serafimovski

== Head coaches ==
- (North Macedonia) Marin Dokuzovski
- (North Macedonia) Steruli Andonovski
- (North Macedonia) Aleksandar Knjazev
- (North Macedonia) Tihomir Matevski
- (North Macedonia) Marjan Lazovski
- (North Macedonia) Lazar Lečić
- (North Macedonia) Emil Rajković
- (North Macedonia) Marjan Srbinovski
- (North Macedonia) Dimitar Mirakovski
- (North Macedonia) Goran Krstevski
- (North Macedonia) Igor Gacov
