= KK Kumanovo =

Basketball club based in Kumanovo, North Macedonia

Kumanovo
- Leagues: Macedonian First League
- Founded: 1946
- Arena: Sports Hall Kumanovo
- Capacity: 6,500
- Location: Kumanovo, North Macedonia
- Team colors: Blue and white
- President: Nenad Stojanovski
- Head coach: Marin Dokuzovski
Home	Away

MKK Kumanovo (Macedonian: МКК Куманово) is a professional basketball club based in Kumanovo, North Macedonia. They currently play in the Macedonian First League. The club play their home matches at the Sports Hall Kumanovo.

== History ==
After its foundation in 1946 the team was only able to achieve national success in 1980 by winning the Yugoslav Macedonian Republic League. During the 1970s and 80s they played in the second-tier of the Yugoslav Federal Basketball League. In the 90s Kumanovo entered the qualifying round for the Korać Cup 1998/99 season, in which they lost a two-legged tie against KK Krka as well as two seasons later in the same competition against BC Yambol. A season later, they played for the first time in the 2001/02 play-off final series for the Macedonian championship, in which they lost two to four wins against record champions and defending champion Feršped Rabotnički from the capital Skopje. Already in the following season the team could not keep up due to financial difficulties and occupied a relegation zone and dissolved in 2003.

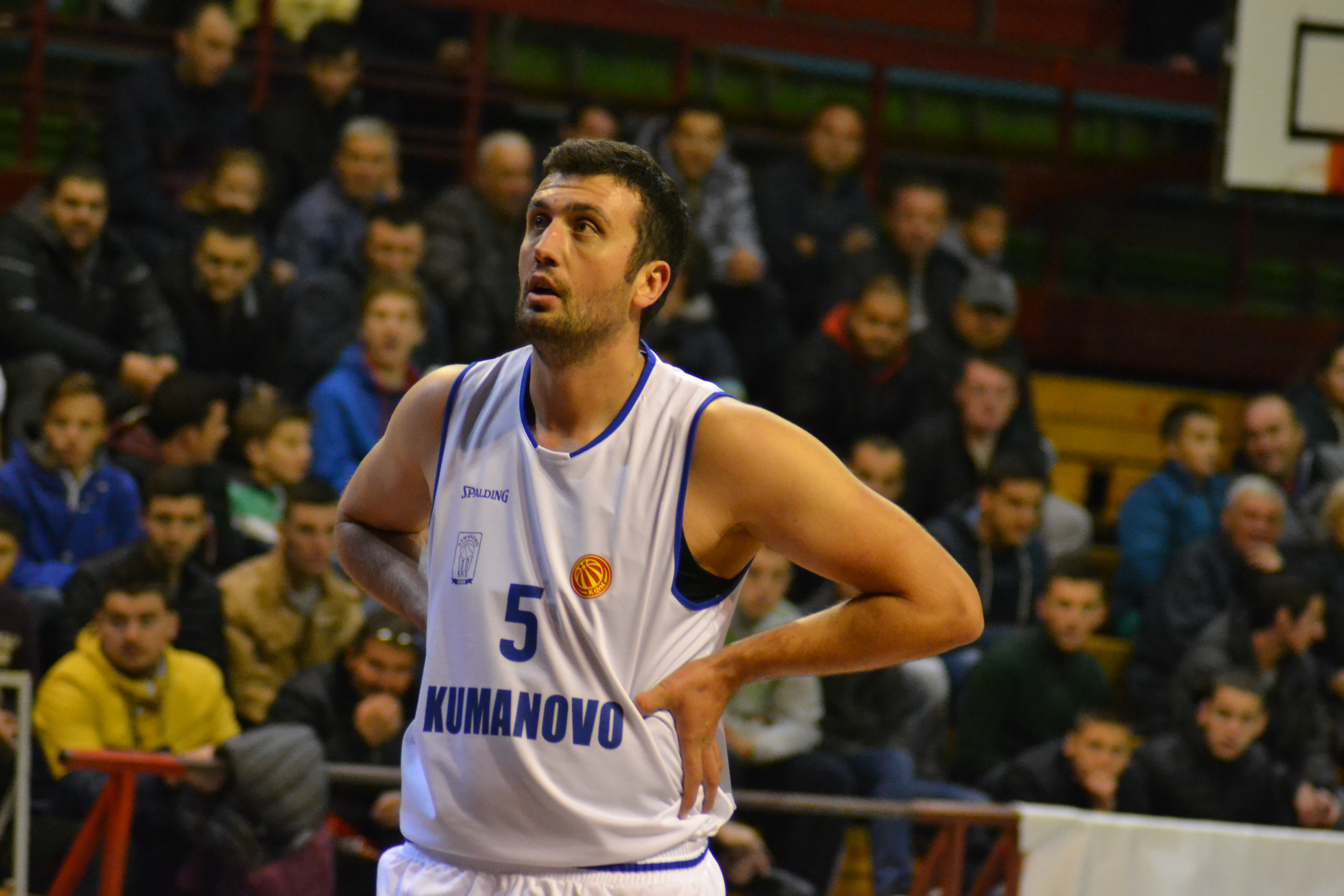
Janeski

In 2009 the club was renewed and returned under the name Kumanovo 2009 in the 2010/11 season to the Macedonian First League. After being re-established in the top division, the first successes came when it reached the Macedonian Cup final in 2013, which was lost to defending champion KK MZT Skopje, and on the other hand in the Balkan League where it participated for the first time, reached the Final Four tournament in which they lost to the title holder Hapoel Gilboa Galil in the semi-finals. In the following season in the Balkan League the team reached the quarter-finals and got eliminated against the later title winner Levski Sofia and again didn't achieve a chance of winning the title in national competitions. This was to change in the 2014/15 season, when the team beat record champion Rabotnički in the play-off semi-final of the championship and went to final again after 13 years. In the final series, however, they lost in three games against defending champion KK MZT Aerodrom.

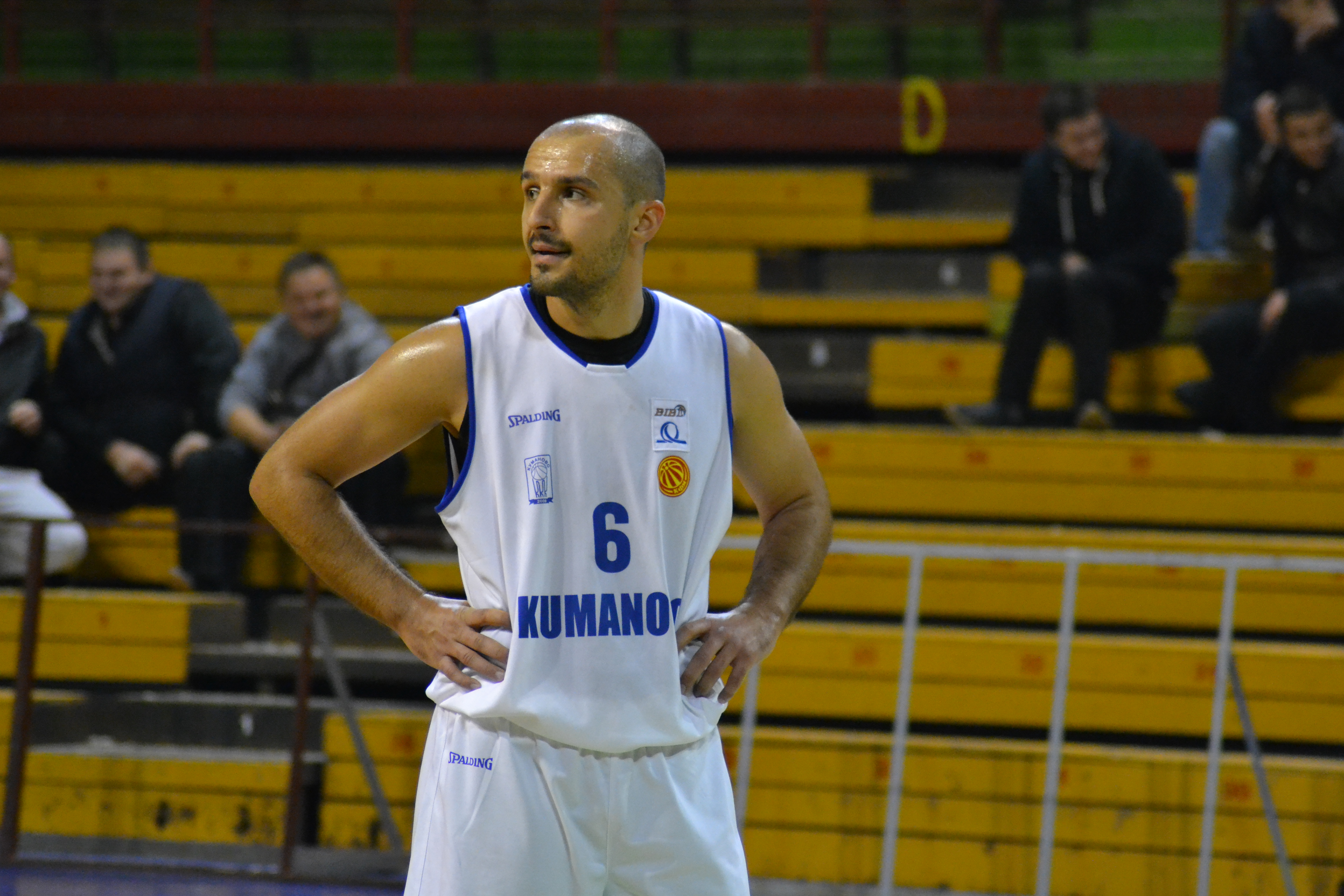
Karadjovski

For the 2015/16 season, the team registered for the FIBA Europe Cup. In the continental club competition, in six preliminary round matches, it was only enough for one home win against Kotkan TP-Basket. In the national championship play-offs they reached the final again and were able to achieve one home win against title defenders MZT Skopje before losing another chance of winning the title in four games.

In the following years, Kumanovo had financial problems, and young domestic players mostly played in the club. In the 2020/2021 season, the club played in the semi-finals of the Macedonian Championship, where they lost 2-1 to the then champion MZT Skopje. In the 2022/2023 season, the club dropped out of the first league after 15 years. After a season where there was no club in the first league, Kumanovo got a new first league club, MKK Kumanovo, which is the successor of the old club. And after many years, the Kumani fan group returned to the stands.

𝗠𝗮𝗿𝗶𝗻 𝗗𝗼𝗸𝘂𝘇𝗼𝘃𝘀𝗸𝗶 𝗘𝗿𝗮 𝟮𝟬𝟮𝟯-

When the club dropped out of the second league on the bench sat down the most trophy Macedonian coach, a coach who reached the 4th place at Eurobasket 2011 with the Macedonian national basketball team Marin Dokuzovski. He brought a new era to the club, returned the club in the first league after a season, and brought quality basketball players like Uros Lukovic, who returned to Kumanovo after 10 years, also signed Antabia Waller, Tadija Tadic and Aleksandar Radukic.

== Honours ==
- Macedonian Basketball League (North Macedonia)

Winner: 1980
Runner-up: 2002, 2015, 2016
Third place: 2025

- Macedonian Basketball Cup

Runner-up: 2013, 2026

- BIBL

Runner-up: 2017

== Home ground ==
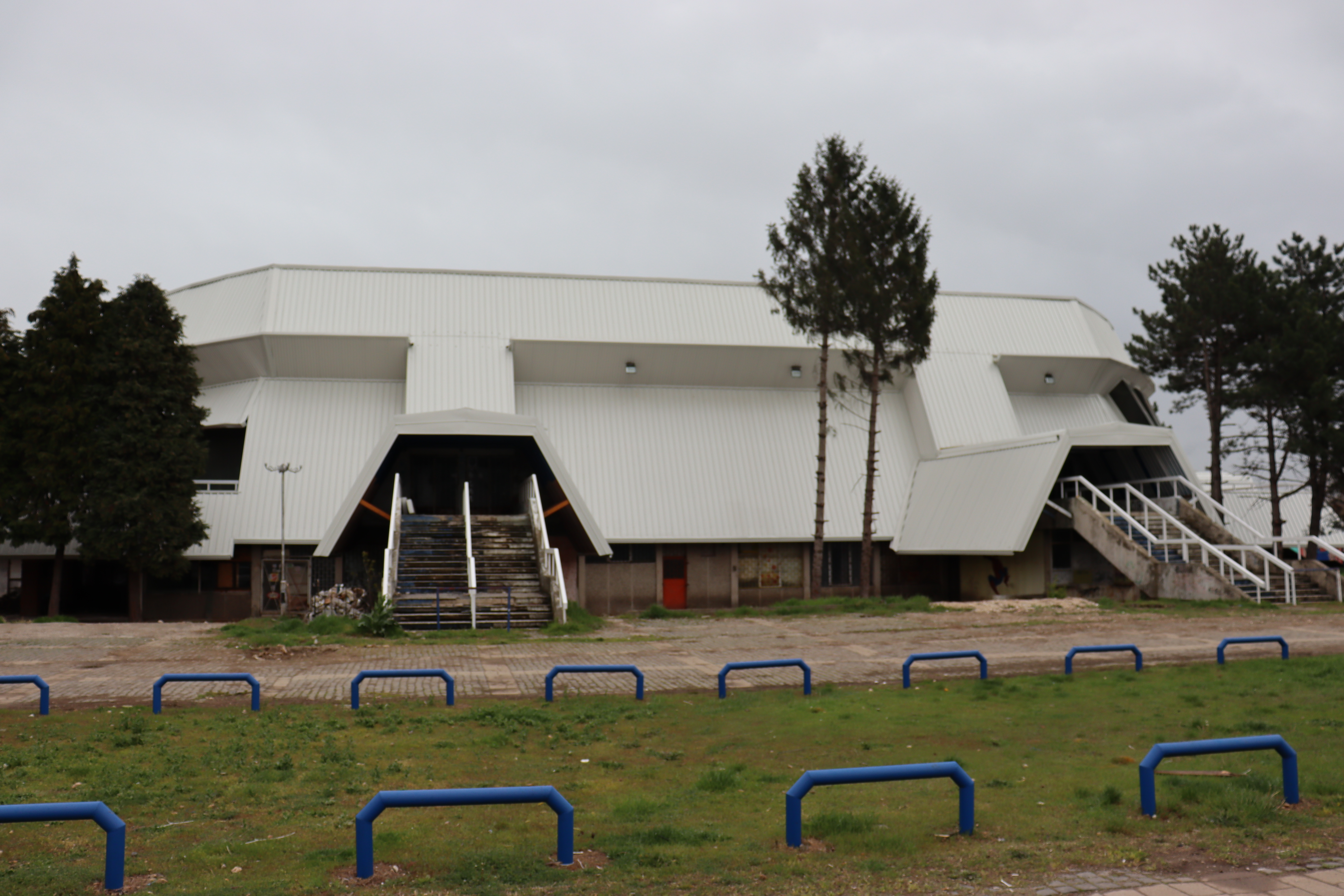
Sports Hall Kumanovo

Sports Hall Kumanovo is a home ground indoor sport venue for BC Kumanovo located in Kumanovo, Macedonia. The hall has capacity of 6,500 seats and was built in 1980.

It is the biggest indoor sport hall in Kumanovo, where competitions of basketball, futsal, handball, volleyball and boxing matches. In 2025 renovation of the Kumanovo Arena finished including new seats and Led roof top screens .

== Current roster ==
MKK Kumanovo roster
Players
Coaches

Pos.	No.	Nat.	Name	Ht.		Age
C	0	(North Macedonia)	Krstevski, Bojan	2.08 m (6 ft 10 in)		37 – 4 June 1989
PG	3	(United States)	Gooden, Cameron	1.80 m (5 ft 11 in)		28 – 6 October 1998
PG	4	(North Macedonia)	Stajić, Boban	1.85 m (6 ft 1 in)		33 – 6 October 1993
SG	5	(North Macedonia)	Petkoski, Alek	1.92 m (6 ft 4 in)		22 – 16 October 2004
SF	6	(North Macedonia)	Stojanovski, Filip	1.93 m (6 ft 4 in)		29 – 5 January 1997
G/F	7	(North Macedonia)	Dimitrievski, Renato	1.96 m (6 ft 5 in)		35 – 17 October 1991
F/C	8	(United States)	Session, Jordan	2.03 m (6 ft 8 in)		30 – 6 October 1996
SG	10	(North Macedonia)	Mitevski, Maksim	1.93 m (6 ft 4 in)		26 – 18 February 2000
F	11	(North Macedonia)	Gjuroski, Stojan	2.03 m (6 ft 8 in)		35 – 6 November 1991
PF	13	(Serbia)	Fundić, Stefan	2.01 m (6 ft 7 in)	105 kg (231 lb)	32 – 30 June 1994
SG	23	(North Macedonia)	Georgievski, Gjorgji	1.91 m (6 ft 3 in)		28 – 12 August 1998
G	25	(Serbia)	Stevanović, Andreja	1.89 m (6 ft 2 in)		31 – 9 July 1995

Head coach

- (North Macedonia) Marin Dokuzovski

Assistant coach(es)

- (North Macedonia) Martin Atanasovski

Physiotherapist(s)

(North Macedonia) Voja Angelovski (North Macedonia) Dalibor Stamenkovski

Team manager

(North Macedonia) Andrej Madzovski

Legend

- (C) Team captain
- Injured

- Roster
Updated: 1 October 2026

=== Depth chart ===
Pos.	Starting 5	Bench 1	Bench 2	Bench 3
C	Stefan Fundić			Jordan Session
PF	Stojan Gjuroski	Bojan Krstevski
SF		Renato Dimitrievski	Filip Stojanovski
SG	Andreja Stevanović	Maksim Mitevski	Gjorgji Gjeorgjievski
PG	Cameron Gooden	Boban Stajić	Alek Petkoski

=== Squad changes for the 2026–27 season ===
==== In ====
Date	Position	Player	Moving from
10 June 2026	G	(North Macedonia) Boban Stajić	(North Macedonia) Pelister
6 August 2026	PF	(North Macedonia) Bojan Krstevski	(North Macedonia) MZT Skopje
17 August 2026	SG	(North Macedonia) Alek Petkoski	(North Macedonia) Madzari
21 August 2026	SF	(North Macedonia) Renato Dimitrievski	(North Macedonia) Gostivar
22 August 2026	PG	(United States) Cameron Gooden	(Mexico) Rayos de Hermosillo
9 September 2026	PF/C	(United States) Jordan Session	(Serbia) Vojvodina
30 September 2026	PF/C	(North Macedonia) Adem Mekić	free agent

==== Out ====
Date	Position	Player	Moving to
TBA	C	(Serbia) Uroš Luković	(Serbia) KK Kolubara LA 2003
TBA	PF	(Bosnia and Herzegovina) Aleksandar Radukić	(Bosnia and Herzegovina) KK Gradina
TBA	PG	(North Macedonia) Luka Dimitrievski	(North Macedonia) KK Strumica
TBA	PG	(North Macedonia) Husein Bajram	(North Macedonia) Sokoli 1933

== Management ==
Position	Name
Board President	(North Macedonia) Nenad Stojanovski
Team Manager	(North Macedonia) Andrej Madzovski

== Supporters ==
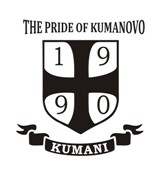
Kumani Zapad logo

The supporters of Kumanovo are called Kumani they were formed in 1990 with the merging of couple of smaller ultras groups. Kumanovo home court is considered one of the hardest to play in because of the loyal supporters.

== Former players ==
- (North Macedonia) Aleksandar Kostoski
- (North Macedonia) Nenad Zivčević
- (North Macedonia) Dejan Trajanovski
- (North Macedonia) Goran Dimitrijević
- (North Macedonia) Igor Mihajlovski
- (North Macedonia) Gjorgji Knjazev
- (North Macedonia) Mirza Kurtović
- (North Macedonia) Pero Blazevski
- (North Macedonia) Dimitar Mirakovski
- (North Macedonia) Srdjan Stanković
- (North Macedonia) Boris Nešović
- (North Macedonia) Dimitar Karadzovski
- (North Macedonia) Bojan Trajkovski
- (North Macedonia) Marko Simonovski
- (North Macedonia) Marjan Janevski
- (North Macedonia) Igor Penov
- (North Macedonia) Gorjan Markovski
- (North Macedonia) Damjan Robev
- (North Macedonia) Adem Mekic
- (North Macedonia) Boban Stajic
- (North Macedonia) Goran Glavcev
- (North Macedonia) Stevan Gligorijević
- (Serbia) Vukašin Mandić
- (Serbia) Uroš Luković
- (Serbia) Branislav Đekić
- (Serbia) Nemanja Jelesijević
- (Serbia) Milan Janjušević
- (Serbia) Saša Avramović
- (Serbia) Nenad Mišanović
- (Serbia) Danilo Negovanović
- (Serbia) Ivan Mišković
- (Serbia) Darko Matić
- (Serbia) Miladin Peković
- (Serbia) Radoslav Peković
- (Serbia) Stefan Živanović
- (Serbia) Mirko Kovač
- (Serbia) Vladimir Filipović
- (Serbia) Filip Dumić
- (Serbia) Jovan Crnić
- (Serbia) Andrija Marjanović
- (Serbia) Djukan Djukanović
- (Serbia) Dusan Juzbasić
- (Serbia) Tadija Tadić
- (United States) Otis Livingston II
- (United States) Malik Evans
- (United States) Anthony Lee-Ingram
- (United States) Royce Parran
- (United States) Antabia Waller
- (United States) Corey Raley-Ross
- (United States) Jonathan Holmes
- (United States) Tyler Hines
- (United States) Phillip Brooks
- (United States) Yorrel Brown
- (Montenegro) Žarko Rakočević
- (Montenegro) Igor Bijelić
- (Montenegro) Nemanja Vranješ
- (Montenegro) Miko Golubović
- (Montenegro) Radoje Vujošević
- (Bulgaria) Georgi Boyanov
- (Bulgaria) Anton Haralanov
- (Bosnia and Herzegovina) Ivica Vukotić
- (Bosnia and Herzegovina) Aleksandar Radukić
- (Bosnia and Herzegovina) Nemanja Nikolić
- (Slovenia) Jan Rizman
- (Slovenia) Blaž Ručigaj
- (Croatia) Marino Šarlija
- (Russia) Georgi Yegorov
- (Panama) Caleb Joseph
- (Canada) Ryan Wright

== Head coaches ==
- (North Macedonia) Aleksandar Todorov
- (North Macedonia) Steruli Andonovski
- (North Macedonia) Goran Dimitrijević
- (North Macedonia) Marjan Srbinovski
- (North Macedonia) Igor Mihajlovski
- (North Macedonia) Strašo Todorović
- (North Macedonia) Vladimir Filipovski
- (North Macedonia) Aleksandar Petrovic
- (North Macedonia) Marin Dokuzovski
- (Serbia) Ljubisav Luković
