= December 2010 in sports =

<<	December 2010					>>
Su	Mo	Tu	We	Th	Fr	Sa
			1	2	3	4
5	6	7	8	9	10	11
12	13	14	15	16	17	18
19	20	21	22	23	24	25
26	27	28	29	30	31
Sports

This list shows notable sports-related deaths, events, and notable outcomes that occurred in December of 2010.

== Deaths in December ==
- 29: Avi Cohen
- 21: Enzo Bearzot
- 15: Bob Feller
- 15: Stan Heal
- 12: Tom Walkinshaw
- 8: John James
- 5: Don Meredith
- 2: Ron Santo

== Sporting seasons ==
=== American football 2010 ===
- National Football League
- NCAA Division I FBS
- NCAA Division I FCS

=== Auto racing 2010 ===
- V8 Supercar
- FIA GT1 World Championship

=== Basketball 2010 ===
- NBA
- NCAA Division I men
- NCAA Division I women
- Euroleague
- EuroLeague Women
- Eurocup
- EuroChallenge
- France
- Germany
- Greece
- Israel
- Italy
- Philippines
  - Philippine Cup
- Russia
- Spain
- Turkey

=== Football (soccer) 2010 ===
National teams competitions

- UEFA Euro 2012 qualifying
- 2012 Africa Cup of Nations qualification

International clubs competitions

- UEFA (Europe) Champions League
- UEFA Europa League
- UEFA Women's Champions League
- Copa Sudamericana
- CAF Confederation Cup
- CONCACAF (North & Central America) Champions League
- OFC (Oceania) Champions League

Domestic (national) competitions

- Argentina
- Australia
- Brazil
- England
- France
- Germany
- Iran
- Italy
- Japan
- Scotland
- Spain

=== Golf 2010 ===
- European Tour
- LPGA Tour

=== Ice hockey 2010 ===
- National Hockey League
- Kontinental Hockey League
- Czech Extraliga
- Elitserien
- Canadian Hockey League:
  - OHL, QMJHL, WHL
- NCAA Division I men
- NCAA Division I women

=== Rugby union 2010 ===
- Heineken Cup
- European Challenge Cup
- English Premiership
- Celtic League
- LV Cup
- Top 14
- Sevens World Series

=== Snooker ===
- Players Tour Championship

=== Winter sports ===
- Alpine Skiing World Cup
- Biathlon World Cup
- Bobsleigh World Cup
- Cross-Country Skiing World Cup
- Grand Prix of Figure Skating
- Freestyle Skiing World Cup
- Luge World Cup
- Nordic Combined World Cup
- Short Track Speed Skating World Cup
- Skeleton World Cup
- Ski Jumping World Cup
- Snowboard World Cup
- Speed Skating World Cup

== Days of the month ==
=== December 31, 2010 (Friday) ===
==== American football ====
- NFL news:
  - The Carolina Panthers announce that they will not renew the contract of head coach John Fox for the 2011 season.
- NCAA bowl games:
  - Meineke Car Care Bowl in Charlotte, North Carolina: South Florida 31, Clemson 26
  - Sun Bowl in El Paso, Texas: Notre Dame 33, Miami 17
  - Liberty Bowl in Memphis, Tennessee: UCF 10, Georgia 6
  - Chick-fil-A Bowl in Atlanta: Florida State 26, South Carolina 17

==== Cross-country skiing ====
- Tour de Ski:
  - Stage 1 in Oberhof, Germany:
    - Men's 3.75 km Freestyle Prologue: (gold) Marcus Hellner (SWE) 7:34.5 (silver) Alexei Petukhov (RUS) 7:36.5 (bronze) Petter Northug (NOR) 7:37.4
      - World Cup Distance standings (after 6 of 17 races): (1) Alexander Legkov (RUS) 333 points (2) Dario Cologna (SUI) 276 (3) Lukáš Bauer (CZE) 253
      - World Cup Overall standings (after 10 of 31 races): (1) Legkov 533 points (2) Cologna 503 (3) Hellner 353
    - Women's 2.5 km Freestyle Prologue: (gold) Justyna Kowalczyk (POL) 6:39.0 (silver) Charlotte Kalla (SWE) 6:40.5 (bronze) Astrid Uhrenholdt Jacobsen (NOR) 6:43.8
      - World Cup Distance standings (after 6 of 17 races): (1) Marit Bjørgen (NOR) 410 points (2) Kowalczyk 365 (3) Kalla 215
      - World Cup Overall standings (after 10 of 31 races): (1) Bjørgen 760 points (2) Kowalczyk 589 (3) Arianna Follis (ITA) 428

==== Ice hockey ====
- World Junior Championships in Buffalo and Lewiston, United States: (teams in **bold** advance to the semifinals, teams in italics advance to the quarterfinals)
  - Group A:
    - Slovakia 0–6 Finland
    - **United States** 2–1 Switzerland
      - Final standings: United States 11 points, Finland 10, Switzerland 6, Slovakia 2, Germany 1.
  - Group B:
    - Canada 5–6 (SO) **Sweden**
    - Czech Republic 3–8 Russia
      - Final standings: Sweden 11 points, Canada 10, Russia 6, Czech Republic 3, Norway 0.
- Spengler Cup in Davos, Switzerland:
  - Final: **SKA Saint Petersburg (Russia)** 4–3 Team Canada
    - SKA Saint Petersburg win the Cup for the fourth time and the first since 1977.

=== December 30, 2010 (Thursday) ===
==== American football ====
- NCAA bowl games:
  - Armed Forces Bowl in University Park, Texas: Army 16, SMU 14
  - Pinstripe Bowl in The Bronx: Syracuse 36, Kansas State 34
  - Music City Bowl in Nashville, Tennessee: North Carolina 30, Tennessee 27 (2OT)
  - Holiday Bowl in San Diego: Washington 19, Nebraska 7

==== Basketball ====
- NCAA women's basketball: Stanford 71, Connecticut 59
  - The Huskies' Division I-record winning streak ends at 90 by the Cardinal, who were also the last team to beat the Huskies.

==== Cricket ====
- Pakistan in New Zealand:
  - 3rd T20I in Christchurch: Pakistan 183/6 (20 overs); New Zealand 80 (15.5 overs). **Pakistan win by 103 runs; New Zealand win 3-match series 2–1.**

==== Equestrianism ====
- Show jumping:
  - FEI World Cup Western European League:
    - 8th competition in Mechelen (CSI 5*-W): (gold) Jessica Kürten (IRL) on Myrtille Paulois (silver) Gregory Wathelet (BEL) on Cortes C (bronze) Jos Lansink (BEL) on Casper van Spieveld
      - Standings (after 8 of 13 competitions): (1) Kevin Staut (FRA) 87 points (2) Rolf-Göran Bengtsson (SWE) 57 (3) Meredith Michaels-Beerbaum (GER) 50

==== Ice hockey ====
- World Junior Championships in Buffalo and Lewiston, United States:
  - Group A:
    - Switzerland 6–4 Slovakia
    - Germany 0–4 United States
      - Standings: United States 8 points (3 games), Finland 7 (3), Switzerland 6 (3), Slovakia 2 (3), Germany 1 (4).
  - Group B:
    - Sweden 6–3 Czech Republic
    - Russia 8–2 Norway
      - Standings: Canada, Sweden 9 points (3 games), Russia, Czech Republic 3 (3), Norway 0 (4).
- Spengler Cup in Davos, Switzerland:
  - Semifinals:
    - **SKA Saint Petersburg** (Russia) 4–3 (OT) (Switzerland) Genève-Servette HC
    - HC Davos (Switzerland) 0–4 **Team Canada**

=== December 29, 2010 (Wednesday) ===
==== Alpine skiing ====
- Women's World Cup in Semmering, Austria:
  - Slalom: (gold) Marlies Schild (AUT) 1:42.06 (silver) Maria Riesch (GER) 1:42.38 (bronze) Christina Geiger (GER) 1:42.58
    - Slalom standings (after 4 of 10 races): (1) Schild 300 points (2) Tanja Poutiainen (FIN) 250 (3) Riesch 240
    - Overall standings (after 13 of 38 races): (1) Riesch 738 points (2) Lindsey Vonn (USA) 617 (3) Poutiainen 430
- Men's World Cup in Bormio, Italy:
  - Downhill: (gold) Michael Walchhofer (AUT) 1:59.66 (silver) Silvan Zurbriggen (SUI) 1:59.74 (bronze) Christof Innerhofer (ITA) 2:00.02
    - Downhill standings (after 3 of 9 races): (1) Walchhofer 245 points (2) Zurbriggen 230 (3) Aksel Lund Svindal (NOR) 109
    - Overall standings (after 11 of 38 races): (1) Zurbriggen 395 points (2) Walchhofer 394 (3) Ted Ligety (USA) 321

==== American football ====
- NCAA bowl games:
  - Military Bowl in Washington, D.C.: Maryland 51, East Carolina 20
  - Texas Bowl in Houston: Illinois 38, Baylor 14
  - Alamo Bowl in San Antonio: Oklahoma State 36, Arizona 10

==== Cricket ====
- England in Australia:
  - Ashes series:
    - Fourth Test in Melbourne, day 4: Australia 98 & 258 (85.4 overs); England 513. **England win by an innings and 157 runs; lead 5-match series 2–1.**
      - England retain The Ashes for the first time since 1986–87.
- India in South Africa:
  - 2nd Test in Durban, day 4: India 205 & 228; South Africa 131 & 215 (72.3 overs). **India win by 87 runs; 3-match series level 1–1.**

==== Football (soccer) ====
- AFF Suzuki Cup Final, second leg (first leg score in parentheses):
  - Indonesia 2–1 (0–3) **Malaysia**. Malaysia win 4–2 on aggregate.
    - Malaysia win the Cup for the first time.

==== Ice hockey ====
- World Junior Championships in Buffalo and Lewiston, United States:
  - Group A: Finland 5–1 Germany
    - Standings: Finland 7 points (3 games), United States 5 (2), Switzerland 3 (2), Slovakia 2 (2), Germany 1 (3).
  - Group B: Norway 1–10 Canada
    - Standings: Canada 9 points (3 games), Sweden 6 (2), Czech Republic 3 (2), Russia 0 (2), Norway 0 (3).
- Spengler Cup in Davos, Switzerland:
  - Quarterfinals:
    - **Genève-Servette HC** (Switzerland) 2–0 (Russia) HC Spartak Moscow
    - **Team Canada** 4–3 (OT) (Czech Republic) HC Sparta Praha

==== Ski jumping ====
- Four Hills Tournament:
  - Stage 1 in Oberstdorf, Germany:
    - HS 137: (gold) Thomas Morgenstern (AUT) 289.6 points (silver) Matti Hautamäki (FIN) 273.1 (bronze) Manuel Fettner (AUT) 264.0
      - World Cup standings (after 8 of 26 events): (1) Morgenstern 705 points (2) Andreas Kofler (AUT) 525 (3) Hautamäki 431

=== December 28, 2010 (Tuesday) ===
==== Alpine skiing ====
- Women's World Cup in Semmering, Austria:
  - Giant slalom: (gold) Tessa Worley (FRA) 2:09.66 (silver) Maria Riesch (GER) 2:10.28 (bronze) Kathrin Hölzl (GER) 2:10.44
    - Giant slalom standings (after 4 of 8 races): (1) Worley 332 points (2) Viktoria Rebensburg (GER) 235 (3) Hölzl 200
    - Overall standings (after 12 of 38 races): (1) Riesch 658 points (2) Lindsey Vonn (USA) 617 (3) Elisabeth Görgl (AUT) 416

==== American football ====
- NFL Week 16 (division champion in **bold**): Minnesota Vikings 24, **Philadelphia Eagles** 14
  - The result earns the Eagles a home game for the Wild Card round of the playoffs and the Chicago Bears a first-round bye.
- NCAA bowl games:
  - Champs Sports Bowl in Orlando, Florida: North Carolina State 23, West Virginia 7
  - Insight Bowl in Tempe, Arizona: Iowa 27, Missouri 24

==== Cricket ====
- England in Australia:
  - Ashes series:
    - Fourth Test in Melbourne, day 3: Australia 98 & 169/6 (66 overs); England 513 (159.1 overs; Jonathan Trott 168*, Peter Siddle 6/75). Australia trail by 246 runs with 4 wickets remaining.
- India in South Africa:
  - 2nd Test in Durban, day 3: India 205 & 228 (70.5 overs); South Africa 131 & 111/3 (27 overs). South Africa require another 192 runs with 7 wickets remaining.
- Pakistan in New Zealand:
  - 2nd T20I in Hamilton: New Zealand 185/7 (20 overs); Pakistan 146/9 (20 overs). **New Zealand win by 39 runs; lead 3-match series 2–0.**

==== Equestrianism ====
- Dressage:
  - FEI World Cup Western European League:
    - 6th competition in Mechelen (CDI-W): (gold) Edward Gal (NED) on Sisther de Jeu (silver) Hans Peter Minderhoud (NED) on Nadine (bronze) Ulla Salzgeber (GER) on Wakana
      - Standings (after 6 of 10 competitions): (1) Salzgeber 74 points (2) Isabell Werth (GER) 57 (3) Richard Davison (GBR) 55

==== Ice hockey ====
- World Junior Championships in Buffalo and Lewiston, United States:
  - Group A:
    - Switzerland 0–4 Finland
    - United States 6–1 Slovakia
      - Standings (after 2 games): United States 5 points, Finland 4, Switzerland 3, Slovakia 2, Germany 1.
  - Group B:
    - Canada 7–2 Czech Republic
    - Sweden 2–0 Russia
      - Standings (after 2 games): Canada, Sweden 6 points, Czech Republic 3, Russia, Norway 0.
- Spengler Cup in Davos, Switzerland: (teams in **bold** advance to the semifinals)
  - Group Torriani: **SKA Saint Petersburg** (Russia) 4–1 (Czech Republic) HC Sparta Praha
    - Final standings: SKA Saint Petersburg 6 points, (Switzerland) Genève-Servette HC 3, HC Sparta Praha 0.
  - Group Cattini: **HC Davos** (Switzerland) 3–2 Team Canada
    - Final standings: HC Davos 6 points, Team Canada 3, (Russia) HC Spartak Moscow 0.

=== December 27, 2010 (Monday) ===
==== American football ====
- NFL Monday Night Football, Week 16 (teams assured of playoff berths in italics): New Orleans Saints 17, Atlanta Falcons 14
- NCAA bowl games:
  - Independence Bowl in Shreveport, Louisiana: Air Force 14, Georgia Tech 7

==== Cricket ====
- England in Australia:
  - Ashes series:
    - Fourth Test in Melbourne, day 2: Australia 98; England 444/5 (136 overs; Jonathan Trott 141*). England lead by 346 runs with 5 wickets remaining in the 1st innings.
- India in South Africa:
  - 2nd Test in Durban, day 2: India 205 (65.1 overs; Dale Steyn 6/50) & 92/4 (30.5 overs); South Africa 131 (37.2 overs). India lead by 166 runs with 6 wickets remaining.

==== Ice hockey ====
- World Junior Championships in Buffalo and Lewiston, United States:
  - Group A: Slovakia 2–1 (OT) Germany
    - Standings: Switzerland 3 points (1 game), United States, Slovakia 2 (1), Finland 1 (1), Germany 1 (2).
  - Group B: Czech Republic 2–0 Norway
    - Standings: Sweden, Canada, Czech Republic 3 points (1 game), Russia 0 (1), Norway 0 (2).
- Spengler Cup in Davos, Switzerland:
  - Group Torriani: HC Sparta Praha (Czech Republic) 3–4 (Switzerland) Genève-Servette HC
    - Standings: (Russia) SKA Saint Petersburg 3 points (1 game), Genève-Servette HC 3 (2), HC Sparta Praha 0 (1).
  - Group Cattini: Team Canada 6–1 (Russia) HC Spartak Moscow
    - Standings: (Switzerland) HC Davos, Team Canada 3 points (1 game), HC Spartak Moscow 0 (2).

=== December 26, 2010 (Sunday) ===
==== American football ====
- NFL Week 16 (division champions in **bold**, teams assured of playoff berths in italics):
  - Washington Redskins 20, Jacksonville Jaguars 17 (OT)
  - Detroit Lions 34, Miami Dolphins 27
  - St. Louis Rams 25, San Francisco 49ers 17
    - After the game, the 49ers fire head coach Mike Singletary and name defensive line coach Jim Tomsula as interim replacement.
  - **Kansas City Chiefs** 34, Tennessee Titans 14
  - **Chicago Bears** 38, New York Jets 34
  - **New England Patriots** 34, Buffalo Bills 3
    - As well as sealing the AFC East, the Patriots clinch the #1 seeding and home-field advantage for the AFC playoffs.
  - Baltimore Ravens 20, Cleveland Browns 10
  - Denver Broncos 24, Houston Texans 23
  - Cincinnati Bengals 34, San Diego Chargers 20
  - Indianapolis Colts 31, Oakland Raiders 26
  - Green Bay Packers 45, New York Giants 17
    - The Giants' loss clinches the NFC East for the Philadelphia Eagles.
  - Tampa Bay Buccaneers 38, Seattle Seahawks 15
  - The Minnesota Vikings–Philadelphia Eagles game originally scheduled for today was postponed to December 28 because of concerns over public safety in light of an incoming snowstorm that had been due to hit the Philadelphia metropolitan area prior to kick-off.
- NCAA bowl games:
  - Little Caesars Pizza Bowl in Detroit: FIU 34, Toledo 32
    - First bowl game appearance and first bowl game win for FIU.

==== Cricket ====
- England in Australia:
  - Ashes series:
    - Fourth Test in Melbourne, day 1: Australia 98 (42.5 overs); England 157/0 (47 overs). England lead by 59 runs with 10 wickets remaining in the 1st innings.
      - Australia's score is their second-lowest total at the MCG, and the lowest score in a home Ashes Test since 1936.
- India in South Africa:
  - 2nd Test in Durban, day 1: India 183/6 (56 overs); South Africa.
- Pakistan in New Zealand:
  - 1st T20I in Auckland: Pakistan 143/9 (20 overs; Tim Southee 5/18); New Zealand 146/5 (17.1 overs). **New Zealand win by 5 wickets; lead 3-match series 1–0.**
    - Southee bowls the third hat-trick in Twenty20 International cricket.

==== Football (soccer) ====
- AFF Suzuki Cup Final, first leg:
  - Malaysia 3–0 Indonesia

==== Ice hockey ====
- World Junior Championships in Buffalo and Lewiston, United States:
  - Group A:
    - Germany 3–4 Switzerland
    - Finland 1–2 (OT) United States
  - Group B:
    - Russia 3–6 Canada
    - Norway 1–7 Sweden
- Spengler Cup in Davos, Switzerland:
  - Group Torriani: Genève-Servette HC (Switzerland) 1–3 (Russia) SKA Saint Petersburg
  - Group Cattini: HC Davos (Switzerland) 4–2 (Russia) HC Spartak Moscow

=== December 25, 2010 (Saturday) ===
==== American football ====
- NFL Christmas game, Week 16: Arizona Cardinals 27, Dallas Cowboys 26

==== Handball ====
- Asian Women's Handball Championship in Almaty, Kazakhstan:
  - 3rd place playoff: Japan 25–26 (bronze) **China**
  - Final: (gold) **Kazakhstan** 33–32 (silver) South Korea
    - Kazakhstan win the title for the second time, repeating their 2002 final victory over South Korea.

=== December 24, 2010 (Friday) ===
==== American football ====
- NCAA bowl games:
  - Hawaiʻi Bowl in Honolulu: Tulsa 62, Hawaiʻi 35

==== Handball ====
- Asian Women's Handball Championship in Almaty, Kazakhstan:
  - 7th place playoff: Iran 20–30 **Thailand**
  - 5th place playoff: North Korea – Uzbekistan

=== December 23, 2010 (Thursday) ===
==== American football ====
- NFL Thursday Night Football, Week 16 (team assured of playoff berth in italics): Pittsburgh Steelers 27, Carolina Panthers 3
- NCAA bowl games:
  - Poinsettia Bowl in San Diego: San Diego State 35, Navy 14

==== Basketball ====
- Euroleague Regular Season, matchday 10: (teams in **bold** advance to the Top 16)
  - Group A:
    - **Caja Laboral** (Spain) 87–71 (Serbia) **Partizan Belgrade**
    - Asseco Prokom Gdynia (Poland) 72–83 (Israel) **Maccabi Tel Aviv**
    - Khimki Moscow (Russia) 93–89 (OT) (Lithuania) **Žalgiris Kaunas**
      - Final standings: Maccabi Tel Aviv 9–1; Caja Laboral, Žalgiris Kaunas, Partizan Belgrade 5–5; Khimki Moscow 4–6; Asseco Prokom Gdynia 2–8.
  - Group B:
    - **Unicaja Málaga** (Spain) 70–72 (Germany) Brose Baskets
    - **Real Madrid** (Spain) 94–45 (Belgium) Spirou Basket
    - **Olympiacos Piraeus** (Greece) 89–82 (Italy) **Virtus Roma**
      - Final standings: Olympiacos Piraeus 7–3; Real Madrid 6–4; Unicaja Málaga, Virtus Roma 5–5; Brose Baskets 4–6; Spirou Basket 3–7.
  - Group C:
    - **Fenerbahçe Ülker** (Turkey) 93–61 (France) Cholet Basket
    - KK Cibona Zagreb (Croatia) 77–94 (Lithuania) **Lietuvos Rytas**
    - **Regal FC Barcelona** (Spain) 73–72 (Italy) **Montepaschi Siena**
      - Final standings: Montepaschi Siena 8–2; Fenerbahçe Ülker, Regal FC Barcelona 7–3; Lietuvos Rytas, Cholet Basket 4–6; KK Cibona Zagreb 0–10.

==== Handball ====
- Asian Women's Handball Championship in Almaty, Kazakhstan:
  - Semifinals:
    - **Kazakhstan** 29–24 Japan
    - **South Korea** 31–26 China

=== December 22, 2010 (Wednesday) ===
==== American football ====
- NCAA bowl games:
  - Maaco Bowl Las Vegas in Whitney, Nevada: Boise State 26, Utah 3

==== Basketball ====
- Euroleague Regular Season, matchday 10: (teams in **bold** advance to the Top 16)
  - Group D:
    - CSKA Moscow (Russia) 78–69 (Turkey) **Efes Pilsen Istanbul**
    - **Power Electronics Valencia** (Spain) 78–77 (Slovenia) **Union Olimpija Ljubljana**
    - **Panathinaikos Athens** (Greece) 93–62 (Italy) Armani Jeans Milano
      - Final standings: Panathinaikos Athens 7–3; Union Olimpija Ljubljana 6–4; Efes Pilsen Istanbul, Power Electronics Valencia 5–5; Armani Jeans Milano 4–6; CSKA Moscow 3–7.

==== Handball ====
- Asian Women's Handball Championship in Almaty, Kazakhstan: (teams in **bold** advance to the semifinals, and qualify for the 2011 World Championship)
  - Group A:
    - **China** 46–17 Iran
    - **Kazakhstan** 35–31 North Korea
      - Final standings: Kazakhstan 6 points, China 4, North Korea 2, Iran 0.
  - Group B: **South Korea** 22–22 **Japan**
    - Final standings: South Korea, Japan 5 points, Uzbekistan 2, Thailand 0.

=== December 21, 2010 (Tuesday) ===
==== Alpine skiing ====
- Women's World Cup in Courchevel, France:
  - Slalom: (gold) Marlies Schild (AUT) 1:34.95 (silver) Tanja Poutiainen (FIN) 1:35.73 (bronze) Tina Maze (SLO) 1:36.93
    - Slalom standings (after 3 of 10 races): (1) Poutiainen & Schild 200 points (3) Maria Pietilä Holmner (SWE) 174
    - Overall standings (after 11 of 38 races): (1) Lindsey Vonn (USA) 581 points (2) Maria Riesch (GER) 578 (3) Elisabeth Görgl (AUT) 366

==== American football ====
- NCAA bowl games:
  - Beef 'O' Brady's Bowl in St. Petersburg, Florida: Louisville 31, Southern Miss 28

==== Basketball ====
- NCAA women's basketball: Connecticut 93, Florida State 62
  - The Huskies record their 89th consecutive win, giving them sole possession of the record for longest winning streak in Division I basketball history.

==== Freestyle skiing ====
- World Cup in Beida Lake, China:
  - Moguls men: (gold) Mikaël Kingsbury (CAN) 25.60 points (silver) Guilbaut Colas (FRA) 24.14 (bronze) Pierre-Alexandre Rousseau (CAN) 24.05
    - Moguls standings (after 3 of 11 events): (1) Colas 240 points (2) Patrick Deneen (USA) 202 (3) Kingsbury 195
    - Overall standings: (1) Colas 48 points (2) Deneen 40 (3) Kingsbury 39
  - Moguls women: (gold) Hannah Kearney (USA) 25.34 points (silver) Jennifer Heil (CAN) 25.26 (bronze) Kristi Richards (CAN) 23.83
    - Moguls standings (after 3 of 11 events): (1) Kearney 280 points (2) Heil 200 (3) Richards 146
    - Overall standings: (1) Kearney 56 points (2) Heil 40 (3) Xu Mengtao (CHN) 36

==== Handball ====
- Asian Women's Handball Championship in Almaty, Kazakhstan: (teams in **bold** advance to the semifinals, and qualify for the 2011 World Championship)
  - Group A:
    - China 33–27 North Korea
    - Kazakhstan 35–13 Iran
      - Standings (after 2 matches): Kazakhstan 4 points, China, North Korea 2, Iran 0.
  - Group B:
    - **South Korea** 60–16 Uzbekistan
    - **Japan** 38–17 Thailand
      - Standings: South Korea, Japan 4 points (2 matches), Uzbekistan 2 (3), Thailand 0 (3).

==== Rugby union ====
- Heineken Cup pool stage, matchday 4:
  - Pool 6: Toulouse (France) 36–10 (Scotland) Glasgow Warriors
    - Standings (after 4 matches): Toulouse 17 points, (England) London Wasps 15, Glasgow Warriors 4, (Wales) Newport Gwent Dragons 1.

==== Volleyball ====
- FIVB Men's Club World Championship in Doha, Qatar:
  - 3rd place: (bronze) **Paykan Tehran** (Iran) 3–2 (Argentina) Drean Bolívar
  - Final: (gold) **Trentino BetClic** (Italy) 3–1 (silver) (Poland) Skra Bełchatów
    - Trentino BetClic win the title for the second straight time.
- FIVB Women's Club World Championship in Doha, Qatar:
  - 3rd place: Mirador (Dominican Republic) 1–3 (bronze) (Italy) **Bergamo**
  - Final: (gold) **Fenerbahçe** (Turkey) 3–0 (Brazil) (silver) Sollys Osasco
    - Fenerbahçe win the title for the first time.

=== December 20, 2010 (Monday) ===
==== American football ====
- NFL Monday Night Football, Week 15 (division champion in **bold**): **Chicago Bears** 40, Minnesota Vikings 14
  - The game was held at the University of Minnesota's TCF Bank Stadium due to the collapse of the inflatable roof at the Metrodome.

==== Cricket ====
- India in South Africa:
  - 1st Test in Centurion, day 5: India 136 & 459 (128.1 overs; Sachin Tendulkar 111*); South Africa 620/4d. **South Africa win by an innings & 25 runs; lead 3-match series 1–0.**

==== Equestrianism ====
- Show jumping:
  - Olympia London International Horse Show in London (CSI 5*-W):
    - Grand Prix: (gold) Pénélope Leprevost (FRA) on Myss Valette (silver) Simon Delestre (FRA) on Oslo du Chalet (bronze) Malin Baryard-Johnsson (SWE) on Reveur de Hurtebise

==== Handball ====
- Asian Women's Handball Championship in Almaty, Kazakhstan:
  - Group A: Iran 22–47 North Korea
  - Group B:
    - Japan 57–22 Uzbekistan
    - South Korea 38–11 Thailand

==== Rugby union ====
- Heineken Cup pool stage, matchday 4:
  - Pool 1: Edinburgh (Scotland) 24–22 (France) Castres
    - Standings (after 4 matches): (England) Northampton Saints 16 points, Castres 10, Edinburgh 7, (Wales) Cardiff Blues 6.
- Amlin Challenge Cup pool stage, matchday 4:
  - Pool 2: Sale Sharks (England) 13–15 (France) Brive in Galashiels
    - Standings (after 4 matches): Brive 18 points, Sale Sharks 11, (Italy) Petrarca 5, (Spain) El Salvador 4.

==== Volleyball ====
- FIVB Men's Club World Championship in Doha, Qatar:
  - Semifinals:
    - **Trentino BetClic** (Italy) 3–0 (Iran) Paykan Tehran
    - **Skra Bełchatów** (Poland) 3–0 (Argentina) Drean Bolívar
- FIVB Women's Club World Championship in Doha, Qatar:
  - Semifinals:
    - **Fenerbahçe** (Turkey) 3–0 (Dominican Republic) Mirador
    - Bergamo (Italy) 0–3 (Brazil) **Sollys Osasco**

=== December 19, 2010 (Sunday) ===
==== Alpine skiing ====
- Women's World Cup in Val-d'Isère, France:
  - Super Combined: (gold) Lindsey Vonn (USA) 2:07.80 (silver) Elisabeth Görgl (AUT) 2:08.26 (bronze) Nicole Hosp (AUT) 2:08.49
    - Overall standings (after 10 of 38 races): (1) Vonn 581 points (2) Maria Riesch (GER) 578 (3) Görgl 366
- Men's World Cup in Alta Badia, Italy:
  - Giant slalom: (gold) Ted Ligety (USA) 2:31.99 (silver) Cyprien Richard (FRA) 2:32.13 (bronze) Thomas Fanara (FRA) 2:32.54
    - Giant slalom standings (after 3 of 7 races): (1) Ligety 300 points (2) Aksel Lund Svindal (NOR) 165 (3) Richard 142
    - Overall standings (after 10 of 38 races): (1) Ligety 321 points (2) Silvan Zurbriggen (SUI) 315 (3) Didier Cuche (SUI) & Michael Walchhofer (AUT) 294

==== American football ====
- NFL Week 15 (teams assured of playoff berths in italics):
  - Cincinnati Bengals 19, Cleveland Browns 17
  - Dallas Cowboys 33, Washington Redskins 30
  - Tennessee Titans 31, Houston Texans 17
  - Indianapolis Colts 34, Jacksonville Jaguars 24
  - Kansas City Chiefs 27, St. Louis Rams 13
  - Buffalo Bills 17, Miami Dolphins 14
  - Detroit Lions 23, Tampa Bay Buccaneers 20 (OT)
    - The Lions win on the road for the first time since 2007, ending the longest road losing streak in NFL history at 26 games.
  - Carolina Panthers 19, Arizona Cardinals 12
  - Baltimore Ravens 30, New Orleans Saints 24
  - Philadelphia Eagles 38, New York Giants 31
    - The Eagles erase a 21-point deficit in the final 8 minutes, capped by DeSean Jackson's punt return touchdown on the game's final play.
  - Atlanta Falcons 34, Seattle Seahawks 18
  - New York Jets 22, Pittsburgh Steelers 17
  - Oakland Raiders 39, Denver Broncos 23
  - Sunday Night Football: New England Patriots 31, Green Bay Packers 27

==== Basketball ====
- Maggie Dixon Classic in New York City: Connecticut 81, Ohio State 50
  - The Huskies women's team ties the UCLA men's team of 1971 to 1974 for the longest winning streak in NCAA Division I history, at 88 games.

==== Biathlon ====
- World Cup 3 in Pokljuka, Slovenia:
  - Mixed Relay: (gold) Sweden (Helena Ekholm, Anna Carin Zidek, Fredrik Lindström, Carl Johan Bergman) 1:17:52.0 (0+4+0+6) (silver) Ukraine (Olena Pidhrushna, Vita Semerenko, Serhiy Semenov, Serguei Sednev) 1:17:52.3 (0+3+0+4) (bronze) France (Marie-Laure Brunet, Marie Dorin, Vincent Jay, Martin Fourcade) 1:17:53.3 (0+6+0+4)

==== Bobsleigh ====
- World Cup in Lake Placid, United States:
  - Four-man: (gold) Steve Holcomb/Justin Olsen/Steven Langton/Curtis Tomasevicz (USA) 1:48.01 (53.70 / 54.31) (silver) Maximilian Arndt/Rene Tiefert/Alexander Rödiger/Martin Putze (GER) 1:48.59 (54.23 / 54.36) (bronze) Lyndon Rush/Justin Wilkinson/Cody Sorensen/Neville Wright (CAN) 1:48.63 (54.17 / 54.46)
    - Standings (after 4 of 8 races): (1) Manuel Machata (GER) 811 points (2) Holcomb 810 (3) Arndt 804

==== Cricket ====
- England in Australia:
  - Ashes series:
    - Third Test in Perth, day 4: Australia 268 & 309; England 187 & 123 (37 overs; Ryan Harris 6/47). **Australia win by 267 runs; 5-match series level 1–1.**
- India in South Africa:
  - 1st Test in Centurion, day 4: India 136 & 454/8 (122.2 overs; Sachin Tendulkar 107*); South Africa 620/4d. India trail by 30 runs with 2 wickets remaining.
    - Tendulkar hits the 50th century of his Test career.

==== Cross-country skiing ====
- World Cup in La Clusaz, France:
  - Men's 4 x 10 km relay: (gold) Switzerland (Toni Livers, Dario Cologna, Remo Fischer, Curdin Perl) 1:42:14.6 (silver) Russia I (Evgeniy Belov, Alexander Legkov, Petr Sedov, Maxim Vylegzhanin) 1:42:45.4 (bronze) Norway I (Eldar Rønning, Martin Johnsrud Sundby, Tord Asle Gjerdalen, Petter Northug) 1:42:48.4
  - Women's 4 x 5 km relay: (gold) Norway I (Vibeke Skofterud, Therese Johaug, Kristin Størmer Steira, Marit Bjørgen) 58:38.7 (silver) Italy (Virginia de Martin Topranin, Marianna Longa, Silvia Rupil, Arianna Follis) 59:35.3 (bronze) Sweden (Sara Lindborg, Anna Haag, Maria Rydqvist, Charlotte Kalla) 1:00:02.8

==== Equestrianism ====
- Show jumping:
  - FEI World Cup Western European League:
    - 7th competition in London (CSI 5*-W): (gold) Michael Whitaker (GBR) on Amai (silver) Billy Twomey (IRL) on Tinka's Serenade (bronze) Kevin Staut (FRA) on Le Prestige de Hus
      - Standings (after 7 of 13 competitions): (1) Staut 78 points (2) Rolf-Göran Bengtsson (SWE) 57 (3) Meredith Michaels-Beerbaum (GER) 50
  - CSI 4* Frankfurt:
    - Grand Prix (Masters League Final): (gold) Janne Friederike Meyer (GER) on Lambrasco (silver) Denis Lynch (IRL) on Lantinus (bronze) Ludger Beerbaum (GER) on Chaman
- Dressage:
  - FEI World Cup Western European League:
    - 5th competition in Frankfurt (CDI-W): (gold) Ulla Salzgeber (GER) on Herzruf's Erbe (silver) Isabell Werth (GER) on El Santo NRW (bronze) Matthias Alexander Rath (GER) on Sterntaler-UNICEF
      - Standings (after 5 of 10 competitions): (1) Salzgeber & Werth 57 points (3) Catherine Haddad (USA) 54

==== Football (soccer) ====
- AFF Suzuki Cup Semi-finals, second leg (first leg score in parentheses):
  - **Indonesia** 1–0 (1–0) Philippines. Indonesia win 2–0 on aggregate.

==== Freestyle skiing ====
- World Cup in Innichen, Italy:
  - Ski Cross men: (gold) Scott Kneller (AUS) (silver) Alex Fiva (SUI) (bronze) John Teller (USA)
    - Ski Cross standings (after 2 of 11 races): (1) Patrick Gasser (SUI) 120 points (2) Kneller 112 (3) Andreas Matt (AUT) 109
    - Overall standings: (1) Patrick Deneen (USA) & Jia Zongyang (CHN) 36 points (3) Guilbaut Colas (FRA) 32
  - Ski Cross women: (gold) Fanny Smith (SUI) (silver) Ashleigh McIvor (CAN) (bronze) Heidi Zacher (GER)
    - Ski Cross standings (after 2 of 11 races): (1) Anna Holmlund (SWE) 150 points (2) Smith 145 (3) McIvor 116
    - Overall standings: (1) Hannah Kearney (USA) & Xu Mengtao (CHN) 36 points (3) Holmlund 30

==== Golf ====
- European Tour:
  - South African Open in Durban, South Africa:
    - Winner: Ernie Els (RSA) 263 (−25)
      - Els wins his 26th European Tour title.

==== Handball ====
- European Women's Championship in Herning, Denmark:
  - Bronze Medal Match: Denmark 15–16 (bronze) **Romania**
    - Romania qualify for the 2011 World Championship.
  - Final: (gold) **Norway** 25–20 (silver) Sweden
    - Norway win the title for the fourth successive time and fifth overall.
- Asian Women's Championship in Almaty, Kazakhstan:
  - Group A: China 22–25 Kazakhstan
  - Group B: Thailand 25–31 Uzbekistan

==== Nordic combined ====
- World Cup in Ramsau, Austria:
  - HS 98 / 10 km: (gold) Mario Stecher (AUT) 24:22.3 (silver) Tino Edelmann (GER) 24:30.9 (bronze) Eric Frenzel (GER) 24:32.5
    - Overall standings (after 6 of 12 races): (1) Jason Lamy-Chappuis (FRA) 435 points (2) Stecher 386 (3) Mikko Kokslien (NOR) 355

==== Rugby union ====
- Heineken Cup pool stage, matchday 4:
  - Pool 1:
    - Edinburgh (Scotland) – (France) Castres — postponed to December 20 due to heavy snow in Edinburgh
    - Cardiff Blues (Wales) 19–23 (England) Northampton Saints
      - Standings: Northampton Saints 16 points (4 matches), Castres 9 (3), Cardiff Blues 6 (4), Edinburgh 3 (3).
  - Pool 5: Leicester Tigers (England) 22–22 (France) Perpignan
    - Standings (after 4 matches): (Wales) Scarlets 15 points, Leicester Tigers 13, Perpignan 12, (Italy) Benetton Treviso 1.
  - Pool 6:
    - Toulouse (France) – (Scotland) Glasgow Warriors — postponed to December 21 due to weather-related travel delays
    - London Wasps (England) 37–10 (Wales) Newport Gwent Dragons
      - Standings: London Wasps 15 points (4 matches), Toulouse 12 (3), Glasgow Warriors 4 (3), Newport Gwent Dragons 1 (4).
- Amlin Challenge Cup pool stage, matchday 4:
  - Pool 2:
    - Sale Sharks (England) – (France) Brive — postponed to December 20 due to frozen pitch
    - El Salvador (Spain) 37–16 (Italy) Petrarca
      - Standings: Brive 14 points (3 matches), Sale Sharks 10 (3), Petrarca 5 (4), El Salvador 4 (4).
  - Pool 3: Newcastle Falcons (England) 26–24 (England) Exeter Chiefs in Galashiels
    - Standings (after 4 matches): (France) Montpellier 13 points, Exeter Chiefs 11, Newcastle Falcons 8, (France) Bourgoin 6.
  - Pool 4: Overmach Parma (Italy) 6–44 (England) Leeds Carnegie
    - Standings (after 4 matches): (France) Stade Français 19 points, Leeds Carnegie 14, (Romania) București Oaks 4, Overmach Parma 1.
  - Pool 5: Gloucester (England) 18–24 (France) La Rochelle
    - Standings (after 4 matches): La Rochelle, (France) Agen 15 points, Gloucester 11, (Italy) Rovigo 0.

==== Ski jumping ====
- World Cup in Engelberg, Switzerland:
  - HS 137: (gold) Andreas Kofler (AUT) 265.1 points (silver) Thomas Morgenstern (AUT) 258.8 (bronze) Adam Małysz (POL) 255.1
    - Standings (after 7 of 26 events): (1) Morgenstern 605 points (2) Kofler 480 (3) Matti Hautamäki (FIN) 351

==== Swimming ====
- World Championships (25 m) in Dubai, United Arab Emirates:
  - Men:
    - 100m freestyle: (gold) César Cielo (BRA) 45.74 CR (silver) Fabien Gilot (FRA) 45.97 (bronze) Nikita Lobintsev (RUS) 46.35
    - 200m backstroke: (gold) Ryan Lochte (USA) 1:46.68 CR (silver) Tyler Clary (USA) 1:49.09 (bronze) Markus Rogan (AUT) 1:49.96
    - 100m individual medley: (gold) Ryan Lochte (USA) 50.86 (silver) Markus Deibler (GER) 51.69 (bronze) Sergey Fesikov (RUS) 51.81
    - 50m breaststroke: (gold) Felipe França Silva (BRA) 25.95 CR (silver) Cameron van der Burgh (RSA) 26.03 (bronze) Aleksander Hetland (NOR) 26.29
    - 200m butterfly: (gold) Chad le Clos (RSA) 1:51.56 (silver) Kaio de Almeida (BRA) 1:51.61 (bronze) László Cseh (HUN) 1:51.67
    - 1500m freestyle: (gold) Oussama Mellouli (TUN) 14:24.16 (silver) Mads Glæsner (DEN) 14:29.52 (bronze) Gergely Gyurta (HUN) 14:31.47
    - 4 × 100 m medley relay: (gold) United States (Nick Thoman, Mihail Alexandrov, Ryan Lochte, Garrett Weber-Gale) 3:20.99 CR (silver) Russia (Stanislav Donets 48.95 CR, Stanislav Lakhtyukhov, Yevgeny Korotyshkin, Nikita Lobintsev) 3:21.61 (bronze) Brazil (Guilherme Guido, Felipe França Silva, Kaio de Almeida, César Cielo) 3:23.12
      - Lochte wins his third gold medal of the day and sixth of the championships.
  - Women:
    - 50m backstroke: (gold) Zhao Jing (CHN) 26.27 CR (silver) Rachel Goh (AUS) 26.54 (bronze) Mercedes Peris (ESP) 26.80
    - 200m breaststroke: (gold) Rebecca Soni (USA) 2:16.39 CR (silver) Sun Ye (CHN) 2:18.09 (bronze) Rikke Møller Pedersen (DEN) 2:18.82
      - Soni wins her third gold medal of the championships.
    - 100m butterfly: (gold) Felicity Galvez (AUS) 55.43 CR (silver) Therese Alshammar (SWE) 55.73 (bronze) Dana Vollmer (USA) 56.25
    - 50m freestyle: (gold) Ranomi Kromowidjojo (NED) 23.37 (silver) Hinkelien Schreuder (NED) 23.81 (bronze) Arianna Vanderpool-Wallace (BAH) 24.04
      - Kromowidjojo wins her third gold medal of the championships.
    - 200m freestyle: (gold) Camille Muffat (FRA) 1:52.29 CR (silver) Katie Hoff (USA) 1:52.91 (bronze) Kylie Palmer (AUS) 1:52.96

=== December 18, 2010 (Saturday) ===
==== Alpine skiing ====
- Men's World Cup in Val Gardena, Italy:
  - Downhill: (gold) Silvan Zurbriggen (SUI) 1:57.21 (silver) Romed Baumann (AUT) 1:57.27 (bronze) Didier Cuche (SUI) 1:57.31
    - Downhill standings (after 2 of 9 races): (1) Zurbriggen 150 points (2) Michael Walchhofer (AUT) 145 (3) Klaus Kröll (AUT) 90
    - Overall standings (after 9 of 38 races): (1) Zurbriggen 315 points (2) Walchhofer 294 (3) Baumann 259
- Women's World Cup in Val-d'Isère, France:
  - Downhill: (gold) Lindsey Vonn (USA) 1:51.42 (silver) Nadja Kamer (SUI) 1:52.10 (bronze) Lara Gut (SUI) 1:52.22
    - Downhill standings (after 3 of 9 races): (1) Vonn 260 points (2) Maria Riesch (GER) 207 (3) Elisabeth Görgl (AUT) 155
    - Overall standings (after 9 of 38 races): (1) Riesch 533 points (2) Vonn 481 (3) Görgl 286

==== American football ====
- NCAA bowl games:
  - New Mexico Bowl in Albuquerque: BYU 52, UTEP 24
  - Humanitarian Bowl in Boise, Idaho: Northern Illinois 40, Fresno State 17
  - New Orleans Bowl in New Orleans: Troy 48, Ohio 21
- NCAA Division I Football Championship (FCS) Semifinal (seed in parentheses): (3) Delaware 27, Georgia Southern 10
- NCAA Division II National Football Championship in Florence, Alabama: Minnesota-Duluth 20, Delta State 17
  - The Bulldogs win their second national championship in three years.
- NCAA Division III National Football Championship in Salem, Virginia: Wisconsin-Whitewater 31, Mount Union 21
  - The Warhawks win their third national title in four years, taking them to 3–3 in the two teams' six consecutive matchups.

==== Biathlon ====
- World Cup 3 in Pokljuka, Slovenia:
  - Men's 10 km Sprint: (gold) Björn Ferry (SWE) 27:25.9 (0+0) (silver) Tarjei Bø (NOR) 27:31.0 (1+0) (bronze) Michael Greis (GER) 27:34.6 (0+0)
    - Sprint standings (after 3 of 10 races): (1) Bø 154 points (2) Emil Hegle Svendsen (NOR) 127 (3) Ole Einar Bjørndalen (NOR) 115
    - Overall standings (after 7 of 26 races): (1) Bø 329 points (2) Svendsen 306 (3) Bjørndalen 265
  - Women's 7.5 km Sprint: (gold) Magdalena Neuner (GER) 23:05.2 (0+2) (silver) Anastasiya Kuzmina (SVK) 23:16.4 (0+1) (bronze) Kaisa Mäkäräinen (FIN) 23:22.2 (1+0) (bronze) Olga Zaitseva (RUS) 23:22.2 (0+0)
    - Sprint standings (after 3 of 10 races): (1) Mäkäräinen 156 points (2) Darya Domracheva (BLR) 122 (3) Helena Ekholm (SWE) & Kuzmina 116
    - Overall standings (after 7 of 26 races): (1) Mäkäräinen 354 points (2) Ekholm 289 (3) Anna Carin Zidek (SWE) 257

==== Bobsleigh ====
- World Cup in Lake Placid, United States:
  - Two-man: (gold) Simone Bertazzo/Sergio Riva (ITA) 1:51.40 (55.61 / 55.79) (silver) Alexandr Zubkov/Dmitry Trunenkov (RUS) 1:51.44 (55.63 / 55.81) (bronze) Karl Angerer/Alex Mann (GER) 1:51.53 (55.53 / 56.00)
    - Standings (after 4 of 8 races): (1) Manuel Machata (GER) 811 points (2) Zubkov 803 (3) Bertazzo 747
  - Women: (gold) Sandra Kiriasis/Stephanie Schneider (GER) 1:54.08 (57.06 / 57.02) (silver) Cathleen Martini/Christin Senkel (GER) 1:54.41 (57.08 / 57.33) (bronze) Helen Upperton/Shelley-Ann Brown (CAN) 1:54.60 (57.34 / 57.26)
    - Standings (after 4 of 8 races): (1) Kiriasis 885 points (2) Martini 827 (3) Bree Schaaf (USA) 720

==== Cricket ====
- England in Australia:
  - Ashes series:
    - Third Test in Perth, day 3: Australia 268 & 309 (86 overs; Michael Hussey 116, Chris Tremlett 5/87); England 187 & 81/5 (27 overs). England require another 310 runs with 5 wickets remaining.
- India in South Africa:
  - 1st Test in Centurion, day 3: India 136 & 190/2 (44.1 overs); South Africa 620/4d (130.1 overs; Jacques Kallis 201*, Hashim Amla 140, AB de Villiers 129). India trail by 294 runs with 8 wickets remaining.

==== Cross-country skiing ====
- World Cup in La Clusaz, France:
  - Men's 30 km Freestyle Mass Start: (gold) Maxim Vylegzhanin (RUS) 1:18:53.5 (silver) Petter Northug (NOR) 1:18:53.6 (bronze) Alexander Legkov (RUS) 1:18:53.9
    - Distance standings (after 5 of 17 races): (1) Legkov 293 points (2) Dario Cologna (SUI) 244 (3) Vylegzhanin 235
    - Overall standings (after 9 of 31 races): (1) Legkov 493 points (2) Cologna 471 (3) Vylegzhanin 325
  - Women's 15 km Freestyle Mass Start: (gold) Marit Bjørgen (NOR) 42:29.6 (silver) Justyna Kowalczyk (POL) 42:30.6 (bronze) Kristin Størmer Steira (NOR) 42:40.5
    - Distance standings (after 5 of 17 races): (1) Bjørgen 410 points (2) Kowalczyk 315 (3) Therese Johaug (NOR) 177
    - Overall standings (after 9 of 31 races): (1) Bjørgen 760 points (2) Kowalczyk 539 (3) Arianna Follis (ITA) 414

==== Football (soccer) ====
- AFF Suzuki Cup Semi-finals, second leg (first leg score in parentheses):
  - Vietnam 0–0 (0–2) **Malaysia**. Malaysia win 2–0 on aggregate.
- FIFA Club World Cup in the United Arab Emirates:
  - Third place playoff: (bronze) **Internacional** (Brazil) 4–2 (South Korea) Seongnam Ilhwa Chunma
  - Final: (silver) TP Mazembe (Democratic Republic of the Congo) 0–3 (gold) (Italy) **Internazionale**
    - Internazionale win the Cup for the first time and become the fourth successive European team to win the tournament.

==== Freestyle skiing ====
- World Cup in Beida Lake, China:
  - Aerials men: (gold) Qi Guangpu (CHN) 245.74 points (silver) Jia Zongyang (CHN) 245.17 (bronze) Renato Ulrich (SUI) 232.72
    - Aerials standings (after 2 of 8 events): (1) Jia 180 points (2) Qi 136 (3) Warren Shouldice (CAN) 130
    - Overall standings: (1) Patrick Deneen (USA) & Jia 36 points (3) Guilbaut Colas (FRA) 32
  - Aerials women: (gold) Xu Mengtao (CHN) 181.53 points (silver) Cheng Shuan (CHN) 176.95 (bronze) Xu Sicun (CHN) 162.14
    - Aerials standings (after 2 of 8 events): (1) Xu Mengtao 180 points (2) Zhang Xin (CHN) & Cheng 140
    - Overall standings: (1) Hannah Kearney (USA) & Xu Mengtao 36 points (3) Zhang & Cheng 28
- World Cup in Innichen, Italy:
  - Ski Cross men: (gold) Patrick Gasser (SUI) (silver) Andreas Matt (AUT) (bronze) Thomas Zangerl (AUT)
  - Ski Cross women: (gold) Anna Holmlund (SWE) (silver) Kelsey Serwa (CAN) (bronze) Nikol Kucerova (CZE)

==== Handball ====
- European Women's Championship in Herning, Denmark:
  - 5th place match: Montenegro 19–23 **France**
  - Semifinals: (winners qualify for 2011 World Championship)
    - Romania 23–25 **Sweden**
    - Denmark 19–29 **Norway**

==== Luge ====
- World Cup in Park City, United States:
  - Men's singles: (gold) Armin Zöggeler (ITA) 1:30.740 (45.301 / 45.439) (silver) Andi Langenhan (GER) 1:30.992 (45.502 / 45.490) (bronze) Viktor Kneyb (RUS) 1:31.097 (45.510 / 45.587)
    - Standings (after 4 of 9 races): (1) Zöggeler 370 points (2) Felix Loch (GER) 290 (3) David Möller (GER) 264
  - Doubles: (gold) Andreas Linger/Wolfgang Linger (AUT) 1:27.331 (43.710 / 43.621) (gold) Peter Penz/Georg Fischler (AUT) 1:27.331 (43.656 / 43.675) (bronze) Tobias Wendl/Tobias Arlt (GER) 1:27.474 (43.790 / 43.684)
    - Standings (after 4 of 9 races): (1) Wendl 330 points (2) Christian Oberstolz (ITA) 315 (3) Penz 280

==== Nordic combined ====
- World Cup in Ramsau, Austria:
  - HS 98 / 4 x 5 km: (gold) Mario Stecher (AUT) 25:46.4 (silver) Björn Kircheisen (GER) 25:47.3 (bronze) Johannes Rydzek (GER) 26:01.9
    - Overall standings (after 5 of 12 races): (1) Jason Lamy-Chappuis (FRA) 385 points (2) Mikko Kokslien (NOR) 329 (3) Stecher 286

==== Rugby union ====
- Heineken Cup pool stage, matchday 4:
  - Pool 2: Leinster (Ireland) 24–8 (France) Clermont
    - Standings (after 4 matches): Leinster 14 points, (France) Racing Métro, Clermont 9, (England) Saracens 6.
  - Pool 3:
    - Ospreys (Wales) 19–15 (Ireland) Munster
    - Toulon (France) 38–17 (England) London Irish
      - Standings (after 4 matches): Toulon 13 points, Munster 11, Ospreys 10, London Irish 5.
  - Pool 4: Bath (England) 22–26 (Ireland) Ulster
    - Standings (after 4 matches): (France) Biarritz 16 points, Ulster 13, Bath 8, (Italy) Aironi 4.
  - Pool 5: Benetton Treviso (Italy) 15–38 (Wales) Scarlets
    - Standings: Scarlets 15 points (4 matches), (England) Leicester Tigers 11 (3), (France) Perpignan 10 (3), Benetton Treviso 1 (4).
- Amlin Challenge Cup pool stage, matchday 4:
  - Pool 3: Bourgoin (France) 36–18 (France) Montpellier
    - Standings: Montpellier 13 points (4 matches), (England) Exeter Chiefs 10 (3), Bourgoin 6 (4), (England) Newcastle Falcons 4 (3).
  - Pool 5: Agen (France) 61–11 (Italy) Rovigo
    - Standings: Agen 15 points (4 matches), (France) La Rochelle 11 (3), (England) Gloucester 10 (3), Rovigo 0 (4).

==== Ski jumping ====
- World Cup in Engelberg, Switzerland:
  - HS 137: (gold) Thomas Morgenstern (AUT) 291.0 points (silver) Adam Małysz (POL) 288.8 (bronze) Matti Hautamäki (FIN) 284.8
    - Standings (after 6 of 26 events): (1) Morgenstern 525 points (2) Andreas Kofler (AUT) 380 (3) Ville Larinto (FIN) 321

==== Snowboarding ====
- World Cup in Telluride, United States:
  - Snowboard Cross men (team): (gold) Luca Matteotti/Alberto Schiavon (ITA) (silver) Alex Deibold/Jonathan Cheever (USA) (bronze) Nick Baumgartner/Jayson Hale (USA)
  - Snowboard Cross women (team): (gold) Aleksandra Zhekova (BUL)/Helene Olafsen (NOR) (silver) Maria Ramberger/Susanne Moll (AUT) (bronze) Lindsey Jacobellis/Callan Chythlook-Sifsof (USA)

==== Swimming ====
- World Championships (25 m) in Dubai, United Arab Emirates:
  - Men's:
    - 50m backstroke: (gold) Stanislav Donets (RUS) 22.93 CR (silver) Sun Xiaolei (CHN) 23.13 (silver) Aschwin Wildeboer (ESP) 23.13
    - 50m butterfly: (gold) Albert Subirats (VEN) 22.40 CR (silver) Andriy Govorov (UKR) 22.43 (bronze) Steffen Deibler (GER) 22.44
  - Women's:
    - 100m breaststroke: (gold) Rebecca Soni (USA) 1:03.98 CR (silver) Leisel Jones (AUS) 1:04.26 (bronze) Ji Liping (CHN) 1:04.79
    - 200m individual medley: (gold) Mireia Belmonte García (ESP) 2:05.73 CR (silver) Ye Shiwen (CHN) 2:05.94 (bronze) Ariana Kukors (USA) 2:06.09
      - Belmonte García wins her third gold medal of the championships.
    - 4 × 100 m freestyle relay: (gold) Netherlands (Femke Heemskerk, Inge Dekker, Hinkelien Schreuder, Ranomi Kromowidjojo) 3:28.54 CR (silver) United States (Natalie Coughlin, Katie Hoff, Jessica Hardy, Dana Vollmer) 3:29.34 (bronze) China (Tang Yi, Zhu Qianwei, Pang Jiaying, Li Zhesi) 3:29.81

=== December 17, 2010 (Friday) ===
==== Alpine skiing ====
- Men's World Cup in Val Gardena, Italy:
  - Super-G: (gold) Michael Walchhofer (AUT) 1:34.35 (silver) Stephan Keppler (GER) 1:35.02 (bronze) Erik Guay (CAN) 1:35.16
    - Super-G standings (after 3 of 7 races): (1) Walchhofer 149 points (2) Georg Streitberger (AUT) 147 (3) Tobias Grünenfelder (SUI) 130
    - Overall standings (after 8 of 38 races): (1) Walchhofer 249 points (2) Benjamin Raich (AUT) 238 (3) Aksel Lund Svindal (NOR) 236
- Women's World Cup in Val-d'Isère, France:
  - Super-G: Cancelled due to heavy snow.

==== American football ====
- NCAA Division I Football Championship (FCS) Semifinal (seed in parentheses): (5) Eastern Washington 41, Villanova 31

==== Bobsleigh ====
- World Cup in Lake Placid, United States:
  - Women: (gold) Sandra Kiriasis/Berit Wiacker (GER) 1:53.94 (56.90 / 57.04) (silver) Shauna Rohbock/Valerie Fleming (USA) 1:54.31 (57.27 / 57.04) (bronze) Cathleen Martini/Kristin Steinert (GER) 1:54.58 (57.39 / 57.19)
    - Standings (after 3 of 8 races): (1) Kiriasis 660 points (2) Martini 617 (3) Rohbock 580

==== Cricket ====
- England in Australia:
  - Ashes series:
    - Third Test in Perth, day 2: Australia 268 & 119/3 (33 overs); England 187 (62.3 overs; Mitchell Johnson 6/38). Australia lead by 200 runs with 7 wickets remaining.
- India in South Africa:
  - 1st Test in Centurion, day 2: India 136 (38.4 overs; Morné Morkel 5/20); South Africa 366/2 (87 overs; Hashim Amla 116*, Jacques Kallis 102*). South Africa lead by 230 runs with 8 wickets remaining in the 1st innings.

==== Freestyle skiing ====
- World Cup in Beida Lake, China:
  - Aerials men: (gold) Jia Zongyang (CHN) 230.49 points (silver) Warren Shouldice (CAN) 210.47 (bronze) Wu Chao (CHN) 205.10
    - Overall standings: (1) Patrick Deneen (USA) 36 points (2) Guilbaut Colas (FRA) 27 (3) Jia 20
  - Aerials women: (gold) Zhang Xin (CHN) 197.04 points (silver) Xu Mengtao (CHN) 185.76 (bronze) Cheng Shuang (CHN) 164.61
    - Overall standings: (1) Hannah Kearney (USA) 36 points (2) Yulia Galysheva (KAZ) 27 (3) Jennifer Heil (CAN) 24

==== Luge ====
- World Cup in Park City, United States:
  - Women's singles: (gold) Tatjana Hüfner (GER) 1:27.075 (43.602 / 43.473) (silver) Anke Wischnewski (GER) 1:27.159 (43.650 / 43.509) (bronze) Alex Gough (CAN) 1:27.346 (43.718 / 43.628)
    - Standings (after 4 of 9 races): (1) Hüfner 400 points (2) Natalie Geisenberger (GER) & Wischnewski 290

==== Rugby union ====
- Heineken Cup pool stage, matchday 4:
  - Pool 2: Racing Métro (France) 14–19 (England) Saracens
    - Standings: (Ireland) Leinster 10 points (3 matches), Racing Métro 9 (4), (France) Clermont 9 (3), Saracens 6 (4).
  - Pool 4: Biarritz (France) 34–3 (Italy) Aironi
    - Standings: Biarritz 16 points (4 matches), (Ireland) Ulster 9 (3), (England) Bath 7 (3), Aironi 4 (4).
- Amlin Challenge Cup pool stage, matchday 4:
  - Pool 1: Connacht (Ireland) 9–15 (England) Harlequins
    - Standings: Harlequins 14 points (4 matches), (France) Bayonne 10 (3), Connacht 6 (4), (Italy) Cavalieri Prato 4 (3).

==== Skeleton ====
- World Cup in Lake Placid, United States:
  - Men: (gold) Sergey Chudinov (RUS) 1:48.51 (54.21 / 54.30) (silver) Martins Dukurs (LAT) 1:48.55 (54.15 / 54.40) (bronze) Kristan Bromley (GBR) 1:48.74 (54.25 / 54.49)
    - Standings (after 4 of 8 events): (1) Dukurs 819 points (2) Bromley 802 (3) Aleksandr Tretyakov (RUS) 755
  - Women: (gold) Marion Thees (GER) 1:51.95 (55.86 / 56.09) (silver) Shelley Rudman (GBR) 1:52.28 (56.17 / 56.11) (bronze) Anja Huber (GER) 1:52.48 (56.06 / 56.42)
    - Standings (after 4 of 8 events): (1) Huber 850 points (2) Rudman 814 (3) Thees 802

==== Ski jumping ====
- World Cup in Engelberg, Switzerland:
  - HS 137: (gold) Thomas Morgenstern (AUT) 134.4 points (silver) Andreas Kofler (AUT) 132.2 (bronze) Wolfgang Loitzl (AUT) 128.6
    - Standings (after 5 of 26 events): (1) Morgenstern 425 points (2) Kofler 330 (3) Ville Larinto (FIN) 276

==== Snowboarding ====
- World Cup in Telluride, United States:
  - Snowboard Cross men: (gold) Pierre Vaultier (FRA) (silver) Seth Wescott (USA) (bronze) Alex Pullin (AUS)
    - Snowboard Cross standings (after 3 of 7 races): (1) Vaultier 1590 points (2) Pullin 1450 (3) Luca Matteotti (ITA) 1280
    - Overall standings: (1) Andreas Prommegger (AUT) 2540 points (2) Roland Fischnaller (ITA) 2310 (3) Rok Flander (SLO) 2110
  - Snowboard Cross women: (gold) Dominique Maltais (CAN) (silver) Aleksandra Zhekova (BUL) (bronze) Maëlle Ricker (CAN)
    - Snowboard Cross standings (after 3 of 7 races): (1) Maltais 3000 points (2) Ricker 2200 (3) Zhekova 1800
    - Overall standings: (1) Maltais 3000 points (3) Yekaterina Tudegesheva (RUS) 2890 (3) Fränzi Mägert-Kohli (SUI) 2750

==== Swimming ====
- World Championships (25 m) in Dubai, United Arab Emirates:
  - Men's:
    - 200m breaststroke: (gold) Naoya Tomita (JPN) 2:03.12 CR (silver) Dániel Gyurta (HUN) 2:03.47 (bronze) Brenton Rickard (AUS) 2:04.33
    - 400m freestyle: (gold) Paul Biedermann (GER) 3:37.06 (silver) Nikita Lobintsev (RUS) 3:37.84 (bronze) Oussama Mellouli (TUN) 3:38.17
    - 50m freestyle: (gold) César Cielo (BRA) 20.51 CR (silver) Frédérick Bousquet (FRA) 20.81 (bronze) Josh Schneider (USA) 20.88
    - 200m individual medley: (gold) Ryan Lochte (USA) 1:50.08 WR (silver) Markus Rogan (AUT) 1:52.90 (bronze) Tyler Clary (USA) 1:53.56
  - Women's:
    - 100m freestyle: (gold) Ranomi Kromowidjojo (NED) 51.45 CR (silver) Femke Heemskerk (NED) 52.18 (bronze) Natalie Coughlin (USA) 52.25
    - 200m backstroke: (gold) Alexianne Castel (FRA) 2:01.67 (silver) Missy Franklin (USA) 2:02.01 (bronze) Zhou Yanxin (CHN) 2:03.22
    - 50m butterfly: (gold) Therese Alshammar (SWE) 24.87 CR (silver) Felicity Galvez (AUS) 24.90 (bronze) Jeanette Ottesen (DEN) 25.24
    - 400m freestyle: (gold) Katie Hoff (USA) 3:57.07 CR (silver) Kylie Palmer (AUS) 3:58.39 (bronze) Federica Pellegrini (ITA) 3:59.52
    - 100m individual medley: (gold) Ariana Kukors (USA) 58.95 (silver) Kotuku Ngawati (AUS) 59.27 (bronze) Hinkelien Schreuder (NED) 59.53
    - 4 × 100 m medley relay: (gold) China (Zhao Jing, Zhao Jin, Liu Zige, Tang Yi) 3:48.29 CR (silver) United States (Natalie Coughlin, Rebecca Soni, Dana Vollmer, Jessica Hardy) 3:48.36 (bronze) Australia (Rachel Goh, Leisel Jones, Felicity Galvez, Marieke Guehrer) 3:48.88

=== December 16, 2010 (Thursday) ===
==== American football ====
- NFL Thursday Night Football, Week 15: San Diego Chargers 34, San Francisco 49ers 7

==== Basketball ====
- Euroleague Regular Season, matchday 9: (teams in **bold** advance to the Top 16)
  - Group A: **Maccabi Tel Aviv** (Israel) 80–76 (Russia) Khimki Moscow
    - Standings (after 9 games): Maccabi Tel Aviv 8–1; (Lithuania) **Žalgiris Kaunas**, (Serbia) **Partizan Belgrade** 5–4; (Spain) **Caja Laboral** 4–5; Khimki Moscow 3–6; (Poland) Asseco Prokom Gdynia 2–7.
  - Group C:
    - **Montepaschi Siena** (Italy) 94–65 (Turkey) **Fenerbahçe Ülker**
    - Lietuvos Rytas (Lithuania) 88–87 (Spain) **Regal FC Barcelona**
      - Standings (after 9 games): Montepaschi Siena 8–1; Fenerbahçe Ülker, Regal FC Barcelona 6–3; (France) Cholet Basket 4–5; Lietuvos Rytas 3–6; (Croatia) KK Cibona Zagreb 0–9.
  - Group D: Armani Jeans Milano (Italy) 60–75 (Spain) Power Electronics Valencia
    - Standings (after 9 games): (Greece) **Panathinaikos Athens**, (Slovenia) **Union Olimpija Ljubljana** 6–3; (Turkey) **Efes Pilsen Istanbul** 5–4; Power Electronics Valencia, Armani Jeans Milano 4–5; (Russia) CSKA Moscow 2–7.

==== Biathlon ====
- World Cup 3 in Pokljuka, Slovenia:
  - Men's 20 km Individual: (gold) Daniel Mesotitsch (AUT) 52:05.6 (1+0+0+0) (silver) Benjamin Weger (SUI) 53:04.0 (0+0+1+0) (bronze) Serguei Sednev (UKR) 53:26.8 (1+0+0+1)
    - Individual standings (after 2 of 4 races): (1) Mesotitsch 91 points (2) Emil Hegle Svendsen (NOR) 85 (3) Sednev 75
    - Overall standings (after 6 of 26 races): (1) Svendsen 282 points (2) Tarjei Bø (NOR) 275 (3) Ole Einar Bjørndalen (NOR) 235
  - Women's 15 km Individual: (gold) Tora Berger (NOR) 42:47.0 (0+0+0+0) (silver) Kaisa Mäkäräinen (FIN) 42:48.8 (0+0+0+1) (bronze) Marie-Laure Brunet (FRA) 43:22.3 (0+0+0+0)
    - Individual standings (after 2 of 4 races): (1) Brunet 102 points (2) Anna Carin Zidek (SWE) 96 (3) Valj Semerenko (UKR) 86
    - Overall standings (after 6 of 26 races): (1) Mäkäräinen 306 points (2) Helena Ekholm (SWE) 253 (3) Zidek 240

==== Cricket ====
- England in Australia:
  - Ashes series:
    - Third Test in Perth, day 1: Australia 268 (76 overs); England 29/0 (12 overs). England trail by 239 runs with 10 wickets remaining in the 1st innings.
- India in South Africa:
  - 1st Test in Centurion, day 1: India 136/9 (38.1 overs); South Africa.

==== Football (soccer) ====
- AFF Suzuki Cup Semi-finals, first leg:
  - Philippines 0–1 Indonesia
- UEFA Europa League group stage, matchday 6: (teams in **bold** advance to the Round of 32)
  - Group A:
    - Red Bull Salzburg (Austria) 0–1 (Poland) **Lech Poznań**
    - Juventus (Italy) 1–1 (England) **Manchester City**
      - Final standings: Manchester City, Lech Poznań 11 points, Juventus 6, Red Bull Salzburg 2.
  - Group B:
    - **Aris** (Greece) 2–0 (Norway) Rosenborg
    - **Bayer Leverkusen** (Germany) 1–1 (Spain) Atlético Madrid
      - Final standings: Bayer Leverkusen 12 points, Aris 10, Atlético Madrid 8, Rosenborg 3.
  - Group C:
    - **Lille** (France) 3–0 (Belgium) Gent
    - Levski Sofia (Bulgaria) 1–0 (Portugal) **Sporting CP**
      - Final standings: Sporting CP 12 points, Lille 8, Gent, Levski Sofia 7.
  - Group G:
    - **Anderlecht** (Belgium) 2–0 (Croatia) Hajduk Split
    - AEK Athens (Greece) 0–3 (Russia) **Zenit St. Petersburg**
      - Final standings: Zenit St. Petersburg 18 points, Anderlecht, AEK Athens 7, Hajduk Split 3.
  - Group H:
    - **Stuttgart** (Germany) 5–1 (Denmark) Odense
    - Getafe (Spain) 1–0 (Switzerland) **Young Boys**
      - Final standings: Stuttgart 15 points, Young Boys 9, Getafe 7, Odense 4.
  - Group I:
    - Debrecen (Hungary) 2–0 (Italy) Sampdoria
    - **PSV Eindhoven** (Netherlands) 0–0 (Ukraine) **Metalist Kharkiv**
      - Final standings: PSV Eindhoven 14 points, Metalist Kharkiv 11, Sampdoria 5, Debrecen 3.

==== Handball ====
- European Women's Championship in Denmark and Norway: (teams in **bold** advance to the semifinals)
  - Group I in Herning:
    - **Romania** 20–35 Russia
    - Spain 22–23 Croatia
    - **Denmark** 29–30 Montenegro
      - Final standings: Denmark 8 points, Romania, Montenegro 6, Russia, Croatia 4, Spain 2.

==== Rugby union ====
- Amlin Challenge Cup pool stage, matchday 4:
  - Pool 4: Stade Français (France) 35–7 (Romania) București Oaks
    - Standings: Stade Français 19 points (4 matches), (England) Leeds Carnegie 9 (3), București Oaks 4 (4), (Italy) Overmach Parma 1 (3)

==== Snowboarding ====
- World Cup in Telluride, United States:
  - Parallel giant slalom men: (gold) Rok Flander (SLO) (silver) Kaspar Flütsch (SUI) (bronze) Manuel Veith (AUT)
    - Parallel slalom standings (after 4 of 12 races): (1) Andreas Prommegger (AUT) 2540 points (2) Roland Fischnaller (ITA) 2310 (3) Flander 2110
    - Overall standings: (1) Prommegger 2540 points (2) Fischnaller 2310 (3) Flander 2110
  - Parallel giant slalom women: (gold) Fränzi Mägert-Kohli (SUI) (silver) Isabella Laböck (GER) (bronze) Yekaterina Tudegesheva (RUS)
    - Parallel slalom standings (after 4 of 12 races): (1) Tudegesheva 2890 points (2) Mägert-Kohli 2750 (3) Alena Zavarzina (RUS) 1878
    - Overall standings: (1) Tudegesheva 2890 points (2) Mägert-Kohli 2750 (3) Dominique Maltais (CAN) 2000

==== Swimming ====
- World Championships (25 m) in Dubai, United Arab Emirates:
  - Men's:
    - 400m individual medley: (gold) Ryan Lochte (USA) 3:55.50 WR (silver) Oussama Mellouli (TUN) 3:57.40 (bronze) Tyler Clary (USA) 3:57.56
    - 100m backstroke: (gold) Stanislav Donets (RUS) 49.07 CR (silver) Camille Lacourt (FRA) 49.80 (bronze) Aschwin Wildeboer (ESP) 50.04
    - 100m breaststroke: (gold) Cameron van der Burgh (RSA) 56.80 CR (silver) Fabio Scozzoli (ITA) 57.13 (bronze) Felipe França Silva (BRA) 57.39
    - 100m butterfly: (gold) Yevgeny Korotyshkin (RUS) 50.23 (silver) Albert Subirats (VEN) 50.24 (bronze) Kaio de Almeida (BRA) 50.33
    - 4 × 200 m freestyle relay: (gold) Russia (Nikita Lobintsev, Danila Izotov, Yevgeny Lagunov, Alexander Sukhorukov) 6:49.04 WR (silver) United States (Peter Vanderkaay, Ryan Lochte, Garrett Weber-Gale, Ricky Berens) 6:49.58 (bronze) France (Yannick Agnel, Fabien Gilot, Clément Lefert, Jérémy Stravius) 6:53.05
  - Women's:
    - 50m breaststroke: (gold) Rebecca Soni (USA) 29.83 (silver) Leiston Pickett (AUS) 29.84 (bronze) Zhao Jin (CHN) 29.90
    - 100m backstroke: (gold) Natalie Coughlin (USA) 56.08 CR (silver) Zhao Jing (CHN) 56.18 (bronze) Gao Chang (CHN) 56.21
    - 800m freestyle: (gold) Erika Villaécija García (ESP) 8:11.61 (silver) Mireia Belmonte García (ESP) 8:12.48 (bronze) Kate Ziegler (USA) 8:12.84

=== December 15, 2010 (Wednesday) ===
==== Basketball ====
- Euroleague Regular Season, matchday 9: (teams in **bold** advance to the Top 16)
  - Group A:
    - Žalgiris Kaunas (Lithuania) 89–95 (OT) (Spain) Caja Laboral
    - Partizan Belgrade (Serbia) 61–59 (Poland) Asseco Prokom Gdynia
      - Standings: (Israel) **Maccabi Tel Aviv** 7–1; Žalgiris Kaunas, Partizan Belgrade 5–4; Caja Laboral 4–5; (Russia) Khimki Moscow 3–5; Asseco Prokom Gdynia 2–7.
  - Group B:
    - Brose Baskets (Germany) 82–75 (Spain) **Real Madrid**
    - **Virtus Roma** (Italy) 81–75 (Spain) **Unicaja Málaga**
      - Standings (after 9 games): (Greece) **Olympiacos Piraeus** 6–3; Real Madrid, Unicaja Málaga, Virtus Roma 5–4; (Belgium) Spirou Basket, Brose Baskets 3–6.
  - Group C: Cholet Basket (France) 81–65 (Croatia) KK Cibona Zagreb
    - Standings: (Italy) **Montepaschi Siena** 7–1; (Turkey) **Fenerbahçe Ülker**, (Spain) **Regal FC Barcelona** 6–2; Cholet Basket 4–5; (Lithuania) Lietuvos Rytas 2–6; KK Cibona Zagreb 0–9.
  - Group D:
    - **Efes Pilsen Istanbul** (Turkey) 79–78 (Greece) **Panathinaikos Athens**
    - **Union Olimpija Ljubljana** (Slovenia) 81–72 (Russia) CSKA Moscow
      - Standings: Panathinaikos Athens, Union Olimpija Ljubljana 6–3; Efes Pilsen Istanbul 5–4; (Italy) Armani Jeans Milano 4–4; (Spain) Power Electronics Valencia 3–5; CSKA Moscow 2–7.

==== Equestrianism ====
- Dressage:
  - FEI World Cup Western European League:
    - 4th competition in London (CDI-W): (gold) Adelinde Cornelissen (NED) on Parzival (silver) Laura Bechtolsheimer (GBR) on Mistral Hojris (bronze) Edward Gal (NED) on Sisther de Jeu
      - Standings (after 4 of 10 competitions): (1) Catherine Haddad (USA) 54 points (2) Richard Davison (GBR) 44 (3) Cornelissen 43

==== Football (soccer) ====
- AFF Suzuki Cup Semi-finals, first leg:
  - Malaysia 2–0 Vietnam
- FIFA Club World Cup in the United Arab Emirates:
  - Fifth place playoff: Al-Wahda (United Arab Emirates) 2–2 (2–4 pen.) (Mexico) **Pachuca**
  - Semifinals: Seongnam Ilhwa Chunma (South Korea) 0–3 (Italy) **Internazionale**
- UEFA Europa League group stage, matchday 6: (teams in **bold** advance to the Round of 32)
  - Group D:
    - Dinamo Zagreb (Croatia) 0–1 (Greece) **PAOK**
    - Club Brugge (Belgium) 1–2 (Spain) **Villarreal**
      - Final standings: Villarreal 12 points, PAOK 11, Dinamo Zagreb 7, Club Brugge 3.
  - Group E:
    - AZ (Netherlands) 3–0 (Belarus) **BATE**
    - **Dynamo Kyiv** (Ukraine) 0–0 (Moldova) Sheriff Tiraspol
      - Final standings: Dynamo Kyiv 11 points, BATE 10, AZ 7, Sheriff Tiraspol 5.
  - Group F:
    - **Sparta Prague** (Czech Republic) 1–1 (Russia) **CSKA Moscow**
    - Lausanne-Sport (Switzerland) 0–1 (Italy) Palermo
      - Final standings: CSKA Moscow 16 points, Sparta Prague 9, Palermo 7, Lausanne-Sport 1.
  - Group J:
    - Karpaty Lviv (Ukraine) 1–1 (France) **Paris Saint-Germain**
    - **Sevilla** (Spain) 2–2 (Germany) Borussia Dortmund
      - Final standings: Paris Saint-Germain 12 points, Sevilla 10, Borussia Dortmund 9, Karpaty Lviv 1.
  - Group K:
    - **Napoli** (Italy) 1–0 (Romania) Steaua București
    - **Liverpool** (England) 0–0 (Netherlands) Utrecht
      - Final standings: Liverpool 10 points, Napoli 7, Steaua București 6, Utrecht 5.
  - Group L:
    - **Beşiktaş** (Turkey) 2–0 (Austria) Rapid Wien
    - **Porto** (Portugal) 3–1 (Bulgaria) CSKA Sofia
      - Final standings: Porto 16 points, Beşiktaş 13, Rapid Wien, CSKA Sofia 3.

==== Freestyle skiing ====
- World Cup in Méribel, France:
  - Dual Moguls Men: (gold) Guilbaut Colas (FRA) (silver) Patrick Deneen (USA) (bronze) Bryon Wilson (USA)
    - Moguls standings (after 2 of 11 events): (1) Deneen 180 points (2) Colas 160 (3) Mikaël Kingsbury (CAN) 95
    - Overall standings: (1) Deneen 36 points (2) Colas 32 (3) Kingsbury 19
  - Dual Moguls Women: (gold) Yulia Galysheva (KAZ) (silver) Hannah Kearney (USA) (bronze) Justine Dufour-Lapointe (CAN)
    - Moguls standings (after 2 of 11 events): (1) Kearney 180 points (2) Galysheva 136 (3) Jennifer Heil (CAN) 120
    - Overall standings: (1) Kearney 36 points (2) Galysheva 27 (3) Heil 24

==== Handball ====
- European Women's Championship in Denmark and Norway: (teams in **bold** advance to the semifinals)
  - Group II in Lillehammer:
    - Ukraine 19–31 France
    - **Sweden** 24–19 Hungary
    - Netherlands 13–35 **Norway**
      - Final standings: Sweden, Norway 8 points, France 6, Netherlands, Hungary 4, Ukraine 0.

==== Swimming ====
- World Championships (25 m) in Dubai, United Arab Emirates:
  - Men's:
    - 200m freestyle: (gold) Ryan Lochte (USA) 1:41.08 CR (silver) Danila Izotov (RUS) 1:41.70 (bronze) Oussama Mellouli (TUN) 1:42.02
    - 4 × 100 m freestyle relay: (gold) France (Alain Bernard, Frédérick Bousquet, Fabien Gilot, Yannick Agnel) 3:04.78 CR (silver) Russia (Yevgeny Lagunov, Sergey Fesikov, Nikita Lobintsev, Danila Izotov) 3:04.82 (bronze) Brazil (Nicholas Santos, César Cielo, Marcelo Chierighini, Nicolas Oliveira) 3:05.74
  - Women's:
    - 200m butterfly: (gold) Mireia Belmonte García (ESP) 2:03.59 CR (silver) Jemma Lowe (GBR) 2:03.94 (bronze) Petra Granlund (SWE) 2:04.38
    - 400m individual medley: (gold) Mireia Belmonte García (ESP) 4:24.21 CR (silver) Ye Shiwen (CHN) 4:24.55 (bronze) Li Xuanxu (CHN) 4:29.05
    - 4 × 200 m freestyle relay: (gold) China (Chen Qian, Tang Yi, Liu Jing, Zhu Qianwei) 7:35.94 WR (silver) Australia (Blair Evans, Jade Neilsen, Kelly Stubbins, Kylie Palmer) 7:37.57 (bronze) France (Camille Muffat, Coralie Balmy, Mylène Lazare, Ophélie Cyrielle Etienne) 7:38.33

=== December 14, 2010 (Tuesday) ===
==== Football (soccer) ====
- FIFA Club World Cup in the United Arab Emirates:
  - Semifinals: **TP Mazembe** (Democratic Republic of the Congo) 2–0 (Brazil) Internacional
    - TP Mazembe become the first African team to reach the final.

==== Handball ====
- European Women's Championship in Denmark and Norway: (teams in **bold** advance to the semifinals)
  - Group I in Herning:
    - **Romania** 23–21 Montenegro
    - Spain 30–22 Russia
    - **Denmark** 31–19 Croatia
      - Standings (after 4 matches): Denmark 8 points, Romania 6, Montenegro 4, Spain, Russia, Croatia 2.
  - Group II in Lillehammer:
    - Netherlands 27–19 Hungary
    - Sweden 21–22 France
    - Ukraine 19–32 Norway
      - Standings (after 4 matches): Norway, Sweden 6 points, Netherlands, France, Hungary 4, Ukraine 0.

=== December 13, 2010 (Monday) ===
==== American football ====
- NFL, Week 14:
  - New York Giants 21, Minnesota Vikings 3 in Detroit
    - Brett Favre's 18-year regular season consecutive start streak ends at 297 games, as a sprained SC joint rules him inactive for the Vikings.
  - Monday Night Football: Baltimore Ravens 34, Houston Texans 28 (OT)

==== Basketball ====
- Euroleague Regular Season, matchday 9: (teams in **bold** advance to the Top 16)
  - Group B: Spirou Basket (Belgium) 67–80 (Greece) **Olympiacos Piraeus**
    - Standings: Olympiacos Piraeus 6–3; (Spain) **Real Madrid**, (Spain) **Unicaja Málaga** 5–3; (Italy) **Virtus Roma** 4–4; Spirou Basket 3–6; (Germany) Brose Baskets 2–6.

==== Handball ====
- European Women's Championship in Denmark and Norway:
  - Group I in Herning:
    - Spain 20–22 Montenegro
    - Romania 31–22 Croatia
    - Denmark 26–20 Russia
      - Standings (after 3 games): Denmark 6 points, Romania, Montenegro 4, Russia, Croatia 2, Spain 0.

=== December 12, 2010 (Sunday) ===
==== Alpine skiing ====
- Men's World Cup in Val-d'Isère, France:
  - Slalom: (gold) Marcel Hirscher (AUT) 1:44.70 (silver) Benjamin Raich (AUT) 1:45.01 (bronze) Steve Missillier (FRA) 1:45.26
    - Slalom standings (after 2 of 10 races): (1) Jean-Baptiste Grange (FRA) & Hirscher 100 points (3) Silvan Zurbriggen (SUI) 90
    - Overall standings (after 7 of 38 races): (1) Aksel Lund Svindal (NOR) 236 points (2) Ted Ligety (USA) 221 (3) Hirscher 200
- Women's World Cup in St. Moritz, Switzerland:
  - Giant slalom: (gold) Tessa Worley (FRA) 2:10.70 (silver) Tanja Poutiainen (FIN) 2:10.71 (bronze) Tina Maze (SLO) 2:11.01
    - Giant slalom standings (after 3 of 8 races): (1) Worley 232 points (2) Viktoria Rebensburg (GER) 206 (3) Poutiainen 156
    - Overall standings (after 8 of 38 races): (1) Maria Riesch (GER) 526 points (2) Lindsey Vonn (USA) 381 (3) Poutiainen 276

==== American football ====
- NFL Week 14 (team assured of playoff berth in italics):
  - Buffalo Bills 13, Cleveland Browns 6
  - Pittsburgh Steelers 23, Cincinnati Bengals 7
  - Detroit Lions 7, Green Bay Packers 3
  - Tampa Bay Buccaneers 17, Washington Redskins 16
  - Atlanta Falcons 31, Carolina Panthers 10
  - Jacksonville Jaguars 38, Oakland Raiders 31
  - San Francisco 49ers 40, Seattle Seahawks 21
  - New Orleans Saints 31, St. Louis Rams 13
  - Miami Dolphins 10, New York Jets 6
  - Arizona Cardinals 43, Denver Broncos 13
  - San Diego Chargers 31, Kansas City Chiefs 0
  - New England Patriots 36, Chicago Bears 7
  - Sunday Night Football: Philadelphia Eagles 30, Dallas Cowboys 27
  - The New York Giants–Minnesota Vikings game originally scheduled for today was postponed to Monday because the Giants were unable to fly to Minneapolis due to a severe winter storm in the area. The game has since been moved to Ford Field in Detroit after the storm caused the roof of the Metrodome to deflate.

==== Badminton ====
- BWF Super Series:
  - Hong Kong Super Series in Hong Kong:
    - Men's singles: **Lee Chong Wei** (MAS) def. Taufik Hidayat (INA) 21–9, 21–9
    - Women's singles: **Saina Nehwal** (IND) def. Wang Shixian (CHN) 15–21, 21–16, 21–17
    - Men's doubles: **Ko Sung-hyun** (KOR)/**Yoo Yeon-seong** (KOR) def. Markis Kido (INA)/Hendra Setiawan (INA) 21–19, 14–21, 23–21
    - Women's doubles: **Wang Xiaoli** (CHN)/**Yu Yang** (CHN) def. Cheng Wen-hsing (TPE)/Chien Yu-chin (TPE) 21–11, 21–12
    - Mixed doubles: **Joachim Fischer Nielsen** (DEN)/**Christinna Pedersen** (DEN) def. Zhang Nan (CHN)/Zhao Yunlei (CHN) 22–20, 14–21, 22–20

==== Biathlon ====
- World Cup 2 in Hochfilzen, Austria:
  - Men's 4 x 7.5 km Relay: (gold) Norway (Alexander Os/Ole Einar Bjørndalen/Emil Hegle Svendsen/Tarjei Bø) 1:29:38.2 (1+5+0+2) (silver) Austria (Daniel Mesotitsch/Tobias Eberhard/Christoph Sumann/Dominik Landertinger) 1:30:31.3 (0+1+0+3) (bronze) France (Vincent Jay/Jean-Guillaume Béatrix/Lois Habert/Martin Fourcade) 1:33:07.0 (1+5+1+4)
  - Women's 10 km Pursuit: (gold) Helena Ekholm (SWE) 35:17.8 (0+1+0+0) (silver) Kaisa Mäkäräinen (FIN) 35:49.8 (0+0+0+2) (bronze) Darya Domracheva (BLR) 36:04.1 (0+0+1+2)
    - Pursuit standings (after 2 of 7 races): (1) Mäkäräinen 114 points (2) Ekholm 108 (3) Anna Carin Zidek (SWE) 83
    - Overall standings (after 5 of 26 races): (1) Mäkäräinen 252 points (2) Ekholm 236 (3) Zidek 204

==== Cricket ====
- Zimbabwe in Bangladesh:
  - 5th ODI in Chittagong: Zimbabwe 188/6 (50 overs); Bangladesh 189/4 (43 overs). **Bangladesh win by 6 wickets; win 5-match series 3–1.**

==== Cross-country skiing ====
- World Cup in Davos, Switzerland:
  - Men's Sprint Freestyle: (gold) Emil Jönsson (SWE) (silver) Alexei Petukhov (RUS) (bronze) Dario Cologna (SUI)
    - Sprint standings (after 3 of 11 races): (1) Jönsson 230 points (2) Fulvio Scola (ITA) 138 (3) Petukhov 136
    - Overall standings (after 8 of 31 races): (1) Cologna 421 points (2) Alexander Legkov (RUS) 398 (3) Marcus Hellner (SWE) 301
  - Women's Sprint Freestyle: (gold) Marit Bjørgen (NOR) (silver) Arianna Follis (ITA) (bronze) Kikkan Randall (USA)
    - Sprint standings (after 3 of 11 races): (1) Follis 210 points (2) Bjørgen 150 (3) Randall 140
    - Overall standings (after 8 of 31 races): (1) Bjørgen 640 points (2) Justyna Kowalczyk (POL) 429 (3) Follis 364

==== Equestrianism ====
- Show jumping:
  - FEI World Cup:
    - Western European League:
      - 6th competition in Le Grand-Saconnex/Geneva (CSI 5*-W): (gold) Kevin Staut (FRA) on Silvana (silver) Eric Lamaze (CAN) on Hickstead (bronze) Rolf-Göran Bengtsson (SWE) on Quintero
        - Standings (after 6 of 13 competitions): (1) Staut 63 points (2) Meredith Michaels-Beerbaum (GER) 50 (3) Bengtsson 49
    - Central European League – North Sub-League:
      - 7th competition in Poznań (CSI 2*-W): (gold) Rein Pill (EST) on Virgin Express (silver) Jarosław Skrzyczyński (POL) on Quintera (bronze) Vladimir Beleskiy (RUS) on Rockelman

==== Football (soccer) ====
- (Argentina) Argentine Primera División Apertura, final matchday:
  - **Estudiantes (LP)** 2–0 Arsenal
  - Racing 0–2 Vélez Sarsfield
    - Final standings: Estudiantes 45 points, Vélez Sársfield 43.
      - Estudiantes win the title for the fifth time.
- (Ecuador) Campeonato Ecuatoriano de Fútbol Serie A Finals, second leg: (first leg score in parentheses)
  - Emelec 1–0 (0–2) **LDU Quito**. LDU Quito win 2–1 on aggregate.
    - LDU Quito win the championship for the tenth time.

==== Golf ====
- European Tour:
  - Alfred Dunhill Championship in Mpumalanga, South Africa:
    - Winner: Pablo Martín (ESP) 277 (−11)
      - Martín retains his title, winning his third European Tour title.

==== Handball ====
- European Women's Championship in Denmark and Norway:
  - Group II in Lillehammer:
    - Netherlands 21–23 France
    - Ukraine 25–26 Hungary
    - Sweden 24–19 Norway
      - Standings (after 3 games): Sweden 6 points, Norway, Hungary 4, Netherlands, France 2, Ukraine 0.

==== Nine-ball pool ====
- Mosconi Cup
  - Team Europe 11–8 Team USA
    - **Mika Immonen** (FIN) 6–1 Rodney Morris (USA)
    - Karl Boyes (ENG) 5–6 **Johnny Archer** (USA)
    - Nick van den Berg (NLD) 5–6 **Dennis Hatch** (USA)
    - **Darren Appleton** (ENG) 6–2 Shane Van Boening (USA)
    - **Ralf Souquet** (GER) 6–4 Corey Deuel (USA)
      - Europe wins the Cup for the fifth time.

==== Rugby union ====
- Heineken Cup pool stage, matchday 3:
  - Pool 2: Clermont (France) 20–13 (Ireland) Leinster
    - Standings (after 3 matches): Leinster 10 points, Clermont 9, (France) Racing Métro 8, (England) Saracens 2
  - Pool 3:
    - Munster (Ireland) 22–16 (Wales) Ospreys
    - London Irish (England) 13–19 (France) Toulon
      - Standings (after 3 matches): Munster 10 points, Toulon 8, Ospreys 6, London Irish 5
  - Pool 6: Newport Gwent Dragons (Wales) 16–23 (England) London Wasps
    - Standings (after 3 matches): (France) Toulouse 12 points, London Wasps 10, (Scotland) Glasgow Warriors 4, Newport Gwent Dragons 1
- Amlin Challenge Cup pool stage, matchday 3:
  - Pool 1:
    - Harlequins (England) 20–9 (Ireland) Connacht
    - Bayonne (France) 65–7 (Italy) Cavalieri Prato
      - Standings (after 3 matches): Bayonne, Harlequins 10 points, Connacht 5, Cavalieri Prato 4
  - Pool 4: Leeds Carnegie (England) 55–6 (Italy) Overmach Parma
    - Standings (after 3 matches): (France) Stade Français 14 points, Leeds Carnegie 9, (Romania) București Oaks 4, Overmach Parma 1

==== Short track speed skating ====
- World Cup 4 in Shanghai, China:
  - Men's:
    - 500m: (gold) Sung Si-Bak (KOR) 42.246 (silver) Thibaut Fauconnet (FRA) 42.327 (bronze) Lee Ho-Suk (KOR) 1:45.278
      - Standings (after 5 of 8 races): (1) Charles Hamelin (CAN) 1722 points (2) Fauconnet 1635 (3) Han Jialiang (CHN) 1590
    - 1500m: (gold) Noh Jinkyu (KOR) 2:18.506 (silver) Yuzo Takamido (JPN) 2:18.825 (bronze) Olivier Jean (CAN) 2:18.842
      - Standings (after 6 of 8 races): (1) Maxime Chataignier (FRA) 1920 points (2) Jeff Simon (USA) 1850 (3) Kim Cheol-min (KOR) 1774
    - 5000m relay: (gold) South Korea 6:48.747 (silver) Canada 6:48.832 (bronze) Netherlands 6:49.912
      - Standings (after 4 of 6 races): (1) Canada 3000 points (2) United States 2240 (3) Korea 1640
  - Women's:
    - 500m: (gold) Zhao Nannan (CHN) 45.049 (silver) Liu Qiuhong (CHN) 45.122 (bronze) Jessica Gregg (CAN) 45.218
      - Standings (after 5 of 8 races): (1) Zhao 3000 points (2) Fan Kexin (CHN) 2080 (3) Liu 2010
    - 1500m: (gold) Cho Ha-Ri (KOR) 2:32.554 (silver) Park Seung-Hi (KOR) 2:32.607 (bronze) Zhou Yang (CHN) 2:32.801
      - Standings (after 6 of 8 races): (1) Katherine Reutter (USA) 2800 points (2) Zhou 2440 (3) Cho 1800
    - 3000m relay: (gold) China 4:16.645 (silver) South Korea 4:16.795 (bronze) Italy 4:20.487
      - Standings (after 4 of 6 races): (1) China 3000 points (2) Canada 1952 (3) United States 1850

==== Ski jumping ====
- World Cup in Harrachov, Czech Republic:
  - HS 142: Cancelled due to strong winds.

==== Snooker ====
- UK Championship in Telford, England:
  - Final: **John Higgins** (SCO) [4] 10–9 Mark Williams (WAL) [5]
    - Higgins wins the title for the third time, and wins his 22nd ranking title.

==== Speed skating ====
- World Cup 5 in Obihiro, Japan:
  - Men's:
    - 500m: (gold) Joji Kato (JPN) 34.96 (silver) Keiichiro Nagashima (JPN) 35.19(3) (bronze) Lee Kyu-Hyeok (KOR) 35.19(8)
      - Standings (after 8 of 12 races): (1) Kato 615 points (2) Lee Kang-Seok (KOR) 590 (3) Nagashima 488
    - 1000m: (gold) Samuel Schwarz (GER) 1:09.98 (silver) Shani Davis (USA) 1:10.15 (bronze) Jan Bos (NED) 1:10.17
      - Standings (after 6 of 8 races): (1) Lee Kyu-Hyeok (KOR) 402 points (2) Davis 380 (3) Stefan Groothuis (NED) 330
  - Women's:
    - 500m: (gold) Jenny Wolf (GER) 38.03 (silver) Lee Sang-hwa (KOR) 38.21 (bronze) Yu Jing (CHN) 38.30
      - Standings (after 8 of 12 races): (1) Wolf 720 points (2) Lee 650 (3) Nao Kodaira (JPN) 475
    - 1000m: (gold) Heather Richardson (USA) 1:17.27 (silver) Nao Kodaira (JPN) 1:17.77 (bronze) Maki Tsuji (JPN) 1:18.29
      - Standings (after 6 of 8 races): (1) Richardson 490 points (2) Christine Nesbitt (CAN) 400 (3) Kodaira 339

=== December 11, 2010 (Saturday) ===
==== Alpine skiing ====
- Men's World Cup in Val-d'Isère, France:
  - Giant slalom: (gold) Ted Ligety (USA) 2:26.26 (silver) Aksel Lund Svindal (NOR) 2:27.31 (bronze) Massimiliano Blardone (ITA) 2:27.47
    - Giant slalom standings (after 2 of 7 races): (1) Ligety 200 points (2) Svindal 125 (3) Kjetil Jansrud (NOR) 106
    - Overall standings (after 6 of 38 races): (1) Svindal 236 points (2) Ligety 221 (3) Mario Scheiber (AUT) 175
- Women's World Cup in St. Moritz, Switzerland:
  - Super-G: Cancelled due to strong winds.

==== American football ====
- NCAA Division I FBS:
  - Army–Navy Game in Philadelphia, Pennsylvania: Navy 31, Army 17
- NCAA Division I FCS:
  - NCAA Division I Football Championship Quarterfinals (seeds in parentheses):
    - Villanova 42, (1) Appalachian State 24
    - Georgia Southern 23, Wofford 20
    - (5) Eastern Washington 38, North Dakota State 31 (OT)
  - SWAC Championship Game in Birmingham, Alabama: Texas Southern 11, Alabama State 6
- Heisman Trophy: Cameron Newton, Quarterback, Auburn Tigers
  - Newton becomes the third Tiger to win the Trophy, after Pat Sullivan in 1971 and Bo Jackson in 1985.

==== Biathlon ====
- World Cup 2 in Hochfilzen, Austria:
  - Men's 12.5 km Pursuit: (gold) Tarjei Bø (NOR) 36:32.4 (0+0+0+1) (silver) Simon Eder (AUT) 37:11.1 (0+0+0+0) (bronze) Ivan Tcherezov (RUS) 37:12.4 (1+0+0+1)
    - Pursuit standings (after 2 of 7 races): (1) Bø 103 points (2) Ole Einar Bjørndalen (NOR) 96 (3) Emil Hegle Svendsen (NOR) 94
    - Overall standings (after 5 of 26 races): (1) Svendsen 257 points (2) Bø 246 (3) Bjørndalen 235
  - Women's 4 x 6 km Relay: (gold) Germany (Kathrin Hitzer/Magdalena Neuner/Sabrina Buchholz/Andrea Henkel) 1:16:22.5 (0+3+0+6) (silver) Ukraine (Oksana Khvostenko/Olena Pidhrushna/Vita Semerenko/Valj Semerenko) 1:17:21.6 (0+4+0+4) (bronze) Norway (Synnøve Solemdal/Ann Kristin Flatland/Fynna Horn/Tora Berger) 1:17:30.9 (0+5+0+4)

==== Bobsleigh ====
- World Cup in Park City, United States:
  - Four-man: (gold) Alexandr Zubkov/Philipp Egorov/Dmitry Trunenkov/Nikolay Hrenkov (RUS) 1:34.62 (47.35 / 47.27) (silver) Manuel Machata/Andreas Bredau/Michail Makarow/Christian Poser (GER) 1:34.65 (47.52 / 47.13) (bronze) Lyndon Rush/Chris le Bihan/Cody Sorensen/Neville Wright (CAN) 1:34.72 (47.46 / 47.26)
    - Standings (after 3 of 8 races): (1) Machata 635 points (2) Zubkov 601 (3) Maximilian Arndt (GER) 594

==== Cricket ====
- ACC Trophy Challenge in Bangkok, Thailand:
  - 3rd place play-off: (bronze) Qatar 223 (48.4 overs); Thailand 107 (32 overs). **Qatar win by 116 runs.**
  - Final: (silver) Saudi Arabia 139 (43.3 overs) vs. (gold) Maldives 140/9 (41.4 overs). **Maldives win by 1 wicket.**

==== Cross-country skiing ====
- World Cup in Davos, Switzerland:
  - Men's 15 km Classic: (gold) Alexey Poltaranin (KAZ) 40:03.5 (silver) Alexander Legkov (RUS) 40:04.4 (bronze) Lukáš Bauer (CZE) 40:07.5
    - Distance standings (after 4 of 17 races): (1) Legkov 198 points (2) Dario Cologna (SUI) 194 (3) Marcus Hellner (SWE) 165
    - Overall standings (after 7 of 31 races): (1) Legkov 398 points (2) Cologna 361 (3) Hellner 265
  - Women's 10 km Classic: (gold) Marit Bjørgen (NOR) 29:31.6 (silver) Justyna Kowalczyk (POL) 30:00.9 (bronze) Therese Johaug (NOR) 30:10.7
    - Distance standings (after 4 of 17 races): (1) Bjørgen 290 points (2) Kowalczyk 205 (3) Johaug 157
    - Overall standings (after 7 of 31 races): (1) Bjørgen 540 points (2) Kowalczyk 389 (3) Charlotte Kalla (SWE) 311

==== Curling ====
- European Championships in Champéry, Switzerland:
  - Men:
    - Bronze medal game: Germany 4–7 (bronze) **Switzerland**
    - Gold medal game: (gold) **Norway** 5–3 (silver) Denmark
      - Norway win the title for the fourth time.
  - Women:
    - Bronze medal game: (bronze) **Switzerland** 9–5 Russia
    - Gold medal game: (silver) Scotland 6–8 (gold) **Sweden**
      - Sweden win the title for a record-extending 18th time.

==== Figure skating ====
- ISU Grand Prix:
  - Grand Prix Final and Junior Grand Prix Final in Beijing, China:
    - Junior Men: (gold) Richard Dornbush (USA) 219.56 (silver) Yan Han (CHN) 186.05 (bronze) Andrei Rogozine (CAN) 181.78
    - Junior Pairs: (gold) Narumi Takahashi / Mervin Tran (JPN) 159.52 (silver) Ksenia Stolbova / Fedor Klimov (RUS) 150.54 (bronze) Yu Xiaoyu / Jin Yang (CHN) 140.58
    - Senior Men: (gold) Patrick Chan (CAN) 259.75 (silver) Nobunari Oda (JPN) 242.81 (bronze) Takahiko Kozuka (JPN) 237.79
      - Chan wins the title for the first time.
    - Senior Ladies: (gold) Alissa Czisny (USA) 180.75 (silver) Carolina Kostner (ITA) 178.60 (bronze) Kanako Murakami (JPN) 178.59
      - Czisny wins the title for the first time.
    - Senior Ice Dancing: (gold) Meryl Davis / Charlie White (USA) 171.58 (silver) Nathalie Péchalat / Fabian Bourzat (FRA) 162.10 (bronze) Vanessa Crone / Paul Poirier (CAN) 139.74
      - Davis/White win the title for the second straight time.
    - Senior Pairs: (gold) Aliona Savchenko / Robin Szolkowy (GER) 210.72 (silver) Pang Qing / Tong Jian (CHN) 189.93 (bronze) Sui Wenjing / Han Cong (CHN) 179.04
      - Savchenko/Szolkowy win the title for the second time.

==== Football (soccer) ====
- FIFA Club World Cup in the United Arab Emirates:
  - Quarterfinals: Al-Wahda (United Arab Emirates) 1–4 (South Korea) **Seongnam Ilhwa Chunma**

==== Freestyle skiing ====
- World Cup in Rukatunturi, Finland:
  - Men's Moguls: (gold) Patrick Deneen (USA) 25.23 points (silver) Mikaël Kingsbury (CAN) 24.89 (bronze) Guilbaut Colas (FRA) 24.78
  - Women's Moguls: (gold) Hannah Kearney (USA) 24.09 points (silver) Jennifer Heil (CAN) 24.02 (bronze) Kristi Richards (CAN) 23.52

==== Handball ====
- European Women's Championship in Denmark and Norway: (teams in **bold** advance to the main round)
  - Group A in Aalborg:
    - **Romania** 40–28 Serbia
    - **Spain** 19–22 **Denmark**
      - Final standings: Denmark 6 points, Romania 4, Spain 2, Serbia 0.
  - Group B in Aarhus:
    - **Russia** 30–21 Iceland
    - **Montenegro** 28–29 **Croatia**
      - Final standings: Russia, Montenegro, Croatia 4 points, Iceland 0.

==== Ice hockey ====
- NCAA: Michigan 5, Michigan State 0
  - In an event billed as The Big Chill at the Big House, a crowd of 113,411 packs Michigan Stadium, normally home to the Michigan football team, and sets a new attendance record for the sport.

==== Luge ====
- World Cup in Calgary, Canada:
  - Men's singles: (gold) Armin Zöggeler (ITA) 1:29.651 (44.741 / 44.910) (silver) Viktor Kneyb (RUS) 1:29.912 (44.867 / 45.045) (bronze) Felix Loch (GER) 1:29.962 (44.952 / 45.010)
    - Standings (after 3 of 9 races): (1) Zöggeler 270 points (2) Loch & David Möller (GER) 230
  - Doubles: (gold) Tobias Wendl/Tobias Arlt (GER) 1:28.099 (43.981 / 44.118) (silver) Christian Oberstolz/Patrick Gruber (ITA) 1:28.172 (44.002 / 44.170) (bronze) Hans Peter Fischnaller/Patrick Schwienbacher (ITA) 1:28.394 (44.092 / 44.302)
    - Standings (after 3 of 9 races): (1) Wendl 260 points (2) Oberstolz 255 (3) Peter Penz (AUT) 180

==== Mixed martial arts ====
- UFC 124 in Montreal, Canada:
  - Welterweight Championship bout: Georges St-Pierre (CAN) (c) def. Josh Koscheck (USA) by unanimous decision (50–45, 50–45, 50–45)
  - Heavyweight bout: Stefan Struve (NED) def. Sean McCorkle (USA) by TKO (punches)
  - Lightweight bout: Jim Miller (USA) def. Charles Oliveira (BRA) by submission (kneebar)
  - Lightweight bout: Mac Danzig (USA) def. Joe Stevenson (USA) by knockout (punch)
  - Welterweight bout: Thiago Alves (BRA) def. John Howard (USA) by unanimous decision (30–27, 30–27, 30–27)

==== Nine-ball pool ====
- Mosconi Cup
  - Team Europe 8–6 Team USA
    - **Mika Immonen** (FIN) / **Karl Boyes** (ENG) 5–1 Dennis Hatch (USA) / Johnny Archer (USA)
    - Mika Immonen (FIN) / Ralf Souquet (GER) 2–5 **Johnny Archer** (USA) / **Corey Deuel** (USA)
    - **Karl Boyes** (ENG) 5–2 Rodney Morris (USA)
    - Darren Appleton (ENG) / Nick van den Berg (NLD) 4–5 **Shane Van Boening** (USA) / **Dennis Hatch** (USA)
    - **Ralf Souquet** (GER) / **Karl Boyes** (ENG) 5–4 Johnny Archer (USA) / Rodney Morris (USA)
    - **Darren Appleton** (ENG) 5–4 Dennis Hatch (USA)
    - **Mika Immonen** (FIN) / **Nick van den Berg** (NLD) 5–1 Shane Van Boening (USA) / Corey Deuel (USA)

==== Rugby union ====
- IRB Sevens World Series:
  - South Africa Sevens in George, Western Cape:
    - Shield: Kenya 5–14 **Zimbabwe**
    - Bowl: **Scotland** 26–0 Russia
    - Plate: **South Africa** 10–5 Argentina
    - Cup: England 19–22 **New Zealand**
      - Standings (after 2 of 8 tournaments): (1) England 44 points (2) New Zealand 40 (3) Samoa 36
- End of year tests:
  - Week 8:
    - Germany 34–13 Hong Kong in Heidelberg
- Heineken Cup pool stage, matchday 3:
  - Pool 1:
    - Castres (France) 21–16 (Scotland) Edinburgh
    - Northampton Saints (England) 23–15 (Wales) Cardiff Blues
      - Standings (after 3 matches): Northampton 12 points, Castres 9, Cardiff Blues 5, Edinburgh 3
  - Pool 2: Saracens (England) 21–24 (France) Racing Métro
    - Standings: (Ireland) Leinster 9 points (2 matches), Racing Métro 8 (3), (France) Clermont 5 (2), Saracens 2 (3)
  - Pool 4:
    - Ulster (Ireland) 22–18 (England) Bath
    - Aironi (Italy) 28–27 (France) Biarritz
      - Standings (after 3 matches): Biarritz 11 points, Ulster 9, Bath 7, Aironi 4
  - Pool 5:
    - Perpignan (France) 24–19 (England) Leicester Tigers
    - Scarlets (Wales) 35–27 (Italy) Benetton Treviso
      - Standings (after 3 matches): Leicester Tigers 11 points, Perpignan, Scarlets 10, Benetton Treviso 1
- Amlin Challenge Cup pool stage, matchday 3:
  - Pool 2:
    - Petrarca (Italy) 37–10 (Spain) El Salvador
    - Brive (France) 18–9 (England) Sale Sharks
      - Standings (after 3 matches): Brive 14 points, Sale Sharks 10, Petrarca 5, El Salvador 0
  - Pool 3: Exeter Chiefs (England) 36–10 (England) Newcastle Falcons
    - Standings (after 3 matches): (France) Montpellier 13 points, Exeter Chiefs 10, Newcastle Falcons 4, (France) Bourgoin 1
  - Pool 4: București Oaks (Romania) 20–29 (France) Stade Français
    - Standings: Stade Français 14 points (3 matches), (England) Leeds Carnegie 4 (2), București Oaks 4 (3), (Italy) Overmach Parma 1 (2)
  - Pool 5:
    - Rovigo (Italy) 10–33 (France) Agen
    - La Rochelle (France) 6–13 (England) Gloucester
      - Standings (after 3 matches): La Rochelle 11 points, Gloucester, Agen 10, Rovigo 0

==== Short track speed skating ====
- World Cup 4 in Shanghai, China:
  - Men's:
    - 1500m: (gold) Kim Cheol-min (KOR) 2:16.190 (silver) Song Weilong (CHN) 2:16.191 (bronze) Maxime Chataignier (FRA) 2:16.315
      - Standings (after 5 of 8 races): (1) Chataignier 1920 points (2) Jeff Simon (USA) 1850 (3) Guillaume Bastille (CAN) 1747
    - 1000m: (gold) Noh Jinkyu (KOR) 1:30.345 (silver) Sjinkie Knegt (NED) 1:30.402 (bronze) Lee Ho-Suk (KOR) 2:10.168
      - Standings (after 5 of 8 races): (1) Thibaut Fauconnet (FRA) 2800 points (2) Travis Jayner (USA) 1702 (3) Anthony Lobello Jr. (USA) 1664
  - Women's:
    - 1500m: (gold) Yang Shin-young (KOR) 2:28.216 (silver) Hwang Hyun-sun (KOR) 2:28.449 (bronze) Kim Dam-min (KOR) 2:28.534
      - Standings (after 5 of 8 races): (1) Katherine Reutter (USA) 2800 points (2) Zhou Yang (CHN) 2440 (3) Biba Sakurai (JPN) 1490
    - 1000m: (gold) Cho Ha-Ri (KOR) 1:32.655 (silver) Zhou Yang (CHN) 1:32.916 (bronze) Liu Qiuhong (CHN) 1:33.595
      - Standings (after 5 of 8 races): (1) Zhou 2440 points (2) Katherine Reutter (USA) 1968 (3) Liu 1690

==== Ski jumping ====
- World Cup in Harrachov, Czech Republic:
  - HS 142: Cancelled due to strong winds.

==== Snooker ====
- UK Championship in Telford, England:
  - Semi-final: **Mark Williams** (WAL) [5] 9–8 Shaun Murphy (ENG) [8]

==== Snowboarding ====
- World Cup in Limone Piemonte, Italy:
  - Parallel slalom men: (gold) Roland Fischnaller (ITA) (silver) Aaron March (ITA) (bronze) Roland Haldi (SUI)
    - Parallel slalom standings (after 3 of 12 races): (1) Fischnaller & Andreas Prommegger (AUT) 2090 points (3) March 1580
    - Overall standings: (1) Fischnaller & Prommegger 2090 points (3) March 1580
  - Parallel slalom women: (gold) Patrizia Kummer (SUI) (silver) Fränzi Mägert-Kohli (SUI) (bronze) Yekaterina Ilyukhina (RUS)
    - Parallel slalom standings (after 3 of 12 races): (1) Yekaterina Tudegesheva (RUS) 2290 points (2) Alena Zavarzina (RUS) 1850 (3) Mägert-Kohli 1750
    - Overall standings: (1) Tudegesheva 2290 points (2) Dominique Maltais (CAN) 2000 (3) Zavarzina 1850

==== Speed skating ====
- World Cup 5 in Obihiro, Japan:
  - Men's:
    - 500m: (gold) Lee Kang-Seok (KOR) 35.11 (silver) Keiichiro Nagashima (JPN) 35.16(3) (bronze) Akio Ota (JPN) 35.16(8)
      - Standings (after 7 of 12 races): (1) Lee 550 points (2) Joji Kato (JPN) 515 (3) Nagashima 408
    - 1000m: (gold) Shani Davis (USA) 1:09.56 (silver) Lee Kyu-Hyeok (KOR) 1:09.80 (bronze) Denny Morrison (CAN) 1:10.39
      - Standings (after 5 of 8 races): (1) Lee 342 points (2) Stefan Groothuis (NED) 330 (3) Davis 300
  - Women's:
    - 500m: (gold) Lee Sang-hwa (KOR) 38.18 (silver) Yu Jing (CHN) 38.21 (bronze) Jenny Wolf (GER) 38.25
      - Standings (after 7 of 12 races): (1) Wolf 620 points (2) Lee 570 (3) Nao Kodaira (JPN) 415
    - 1000m: (gold) Heather Richardson (USA) 1:16.45 (silver) Nao Kodaira (JPN) 1:17.33 (bronze) Lee Sang-hwa (KOR) 1:17.87
      - Standings (after 5 of 8 races): (1) Christine Nesbitt (CAN) 400 points (2) Richardson 390 (3) Margot Boer (NED) 260

=== December 10, 2010 (Friday) ===
==== American football ====
- NCAA Division I Football Championship Quarterfinal (seed in parentheses):
  - (3) Delaware 16, New Hampshire 3

==== Basketball ====
- NBA: Denver Nuggets 123, Toronto Raptors 116
  - In his 1,679th match as a head coach, George Karl becomes the seventh coach to record 1,000 regular season wins.

==== Biathlon ====
- World Cup 2 in Hochfilzen, Austria:
  - Men's 10 km Sprint: (gold) Tarjei Bø (NOR) 28:17.6 (0+0) (silver) Serguei Sednev (UKR) 28:45.1 (0+1) (bronze) Alexis Bœuf (FRA) 28:50.9 (0+1)
    - Sprint standings (after 2 of 10 races): (1) Emil Hegle Svendsen (NOR) 103 points (2) Bø 100 (3) Ole Einar Bjørndalen (NOR) 85
    - Overall standings (after 4 of 26 races): (1) Svendsen 217 points (2) Bjørndalen 199 (3) Bø 186
  - Women's 7.5 km Sprint: (gold) Anastasiya Kuzmina (SVK) 25:30.6 (0+0) (silver) Darya Domracheva (BLR) 25:50.4 (0+1) (bronze) Kaisa Mäkäräinen (FIN) 25:54.4 (0+1)
    - Sprint standings (after 2 of 10 races): (1) Mäkäräinen 108 points (2) Domracheva 102 (3) Helena Ekholm (SWE) 80
    - Overall standings (after 4 of 26 races): (1) Mäkäräinen 198 points (2) Ekholm 176 (3) Anna Carin Zidek (SWE) 164

==== Bobsleigh ====
- World Cup in Park City, United States:
  - Two-man: (gold) Alexandr Zubkov/Dmitry Trunenkov (RUS) 1:37.33 (48.95 / 48.38) (silver) Simone Bertazzo/Sergio Riva (ITA) 1:37.47 (49.15 / 48.32) (bronze) Manuel Machata/Andreas Bredau (GER) 1:37.67 (49.30 / 48.37)
    - Standings (after 3 of 8 races): (1) Machata 635 points (2) Zubkov 593 (3) Lyndon Rush (CAN) & Patrice Servelle (MON) 546
  - Women: Cancelled due to snowstorms.

==== Cricket ====
- New Zealand in India:
  - 5th ODI in Chennai: New Zealand 103 (27 overs); India 107/2 (21.1 overs). **India win by 8 wickets; win 5-match series 5–0.**
- Zimbabwe in Bangladesh:
  - 4th ODI in Chittagong: Bangladesh vs. Zimbabwe. **Match abandoned without a ball bowled; Bangladesh lead 5-match series 2–1.**

==== Curling ====
- European Championships in Champéry, Switzerland:
  - Men Semifinal: Switzerland 7–9 **Denmark**
  - Women Semifinal: Russia 5–7 **Sweden**

==== Figure skating ====
- ISU Grand Prix:
  - Grand Prix Final and Junior Grand Prix Final in Beijing, China:
    - Junior Ice dancing: (gold) Ksenia Monko / Kirill Khaliavin (RUS) 136.22 (silver) Victoria Sinitsina / Ruslan Zhiganshin (RUS) 134.62 (bronze) Alexandra Stepanova / Ivan Bukin (RUS) 129.94
    - Junior Ladies: (gold) Adelina Sotnikova (RUS) 169.81 (silver) Elizaveta Tuktamysheva (RUS) 160.87 (bronze) Li Zijun (CHN) 149.82
    - Senior Ice Dance – Short Dance: (1) Meryl Davis / Charlie White (USA) 68.64 (2) Nathalie Péchalat / Fabian Bourzat (FRA) 65.66 (3) Nóra Hoffmann / Maxim Zavozin (HUN) 55.98
    - Senior Men – Short Program: (1) Nobunari Oda (JPN) 86.59 (2) Patrick Chan (CAN) 85.59 (3) Daisuke Takahashi (JPN) 82.57
    - Senior Ladies – Short Program: (1) Alissa Czisny (USA) 63.76 (2) Carolina Kostner (ITA) 62.13 (3) Kanako Murakami (JPN) 61.47
    - Senior Pairs – Short Program: (1) Aliona Savchenko / Robin Szolkowy (GER) 74.40 (2) Pang Qing / Tong Jian (CHN) 68.63 (3) Vera Bazarova / Yuri Larionov (RUS) 63.86

==== Football (soccer) ====
- FIFA Club World Cup in the United Arab Emirates:
  - Quarterfinals: **TP Mazembe** (Democratic Republic of the Congo) 1–0 (Mexico) Pachuca

==== Handball ====
- European Women's Championship in Denmark and Norway: (teams in **bold** advance to the main round)
  - Group C in Larvik:
    - **Sweden** 25–18 **Netherlands**
    - Germany 23–33 Ukraine
      - Final standings: Sweden 6 points, Netherlands, Ukraine, Germany 2.
  - Group D in Lillehammer:
    - France 29–19 Slovenia
    - **Norway** 34–13 **Hungary**
      - Final standings: Norway 6 points, Hungary 4, France 2, Slovenia 0.

==== Luge ====
- World Cup in Calgary, Canada:
  - Women' singles: (gold) Tatjana Hüfner (GER) 1:33.658 (46.814 / 46.844) (silver) Anke Wischnewski (GER) 1:33.801 (46.912 / 46.889) (bronze) Erin Hamlin (USA) 1:33.955 (46.969 / 46.986)
    - Standings (after 3 of 9 races): (1) Hüfner 300 points (2) Natalie Geisenberger (GER) 230 (3) Wischnewski 205

==== Nine-ball pool ====
- Mosconi Cup
  - Team Europe 3–4 Team USA
    - **Darren Appleton** (ENG) / **Karl Boyes** (ENG) 6–3 Shane Van Boening (USA) / Johnny Archer (USA)
    - Ralf Souquet (GER) 5–6 **Johnny Archer** (USA)
    - **Ralf Souquet** (GER) / **Darren Appleton** (ENG) 6–5 Rodney Morris (USA) / Corey Deuel (USA)
    - Nick van den Berg (NLD) 5–6 **Shane Van Boening** (USA)

==== Rugby union ====
- Heineken Cup pool stage, matchday 3:
  - Pool 6: Glasgow Warriors (Scotland) 16–28 (France) Toulouse
    - Standings: Toulouse 12 points (3 matches), (England) London Wasps 6 (2), Glasgow Warriors 4 (3), (Wales) Newport Gwent Dragons 0 (2).

==== Snooker ====
- UK Championship in Telford, England:
  - Semi-final: Mark Allen (NIR) [12] 5–9 **John Higgins** (SCO) [4]

==== Snowboarding ====
- World Cup in Limone Piemonte, Italy:
  - Parallel giant slalom men: (gold) Benjamin Karl (AUT) (silver) Andreas Prommegger (AUT) (bronze) Manuel Veith (AUT)
    - Parallel slalom standings (after 2 of 12 races): (1) Prommegger 1800 points (2) Karl 1260 (3) Roland Fischnaller (ITA) 1090
    - Overall standings: (1) Prommegger 1800 points (2) Karl 1260 (3) Sébastien Toutant (CAN) 1220
  - Parallel giant slalom women: (gold) Yekaterina Tudegesheva (RUS) (silver) Alena Zavarzina (RUS) (bronze) Svetlana Boldykova (RUS)
    - Parallel slalom standings (after 2 of 12 races): (1) Tudegesheva 2000 points (2) Zavarzina 1400 (3) Fränzi Mägert-Kohli (SUI) & Heidi Neururer (AUT) 950
    - Overall standings: (1) Dominique Maltais (CAN) & Tudegesheva 2000 points (3) Maëlle Ricker (CAN) 1600

==== U.S. college sports ====
- Conference realignment: The University of Hawaiʻi announces that it will leave the Western Athletic Conference in July 2012. The Hawaiʻi football program will join the Mountain West Conference, while the school's other teams will join the Big West Conference.

=== December 9, 2010 (Thursday) ===
==== American football ====
- NFL Thursday Night Football, Week 14: Indianapolis Colts 30, Tennessee Titans 28

==== Basketball ====
- Euroleague Regular Season, matchday 8: (teams in **bold** advance to the Top 16)
  - Group A:
    - **Maccabi Tel Aviv** (Israel) 76–62 (Serbia) Partizan Belgrade
    - Asseco Prokom Gdynia (Poland) 69–72 (Lithuania) Žalgiris Kaunas
    - Caja Laboral (Spain) 89–81 (Russia) Khimki Moscow
      - Standings (after 8 games): Maccabi Tel Aviv 7–1; Žalgiris Kaunas 5–3; Partizan Belgrade 4–4; Caja Laboral, Khimki Moscow 3–5; Asseco Prokom Gdynia 2–6.
  - Group B:
    - Unicaja Málaga (Spain) 76–74 (Greece) Olympiacos Piraeus
    - Real Madrid (Spain) 72–50 (Italy) Virtus Roma
      - Standings (after 8 games): Olympiacos Piraeus, Real Madrid, Unicaja Málaga 5–3; Virtus Roma 4–4; (Belgium) Spirou Basket 3–5; (Germany) Brose Baskets 2–6.
  - Group C:
    - Lietuvos Rytas (Lithuania) 92–80 (France) Cholet Basket
    - **Fenerbahçe Ülker** (Turkey) 69–75 (Spain) **Regal FC Barcelona**
      - Standings (after 8 games): (Italy) **Montepaschi Siena** 7–1; Fenerbahçe Ülker, Regal FC Barcelona 6–2; Cholet Basket 3–5; Lietuvos Rytas 2–6; (Croatia) KK Cibona Zagreb 0–8.
  - Group D: **Panathinaikos Athens** (Greece) 95–88 (Slovenia) Union Olimpija Ljubljana (OT)
    - Standings (after 8 games): Panathinaikos Athens 6–2; Union Olimpija Ljubljana 5–3; (Italy) Armani Jeans Milano, (Turkey) Efes Pilsen Istanbul 4–4; (Spain) Power Electronics Valencia 3–5; (Russia) CSKA Moscow 2–6.

==== Curling ====
- European Championships in Champéry, Switzerland:
  - Men: (teams in **bold** advance to the play-off; teams in italics qualify for the 2011 World Championship)
    - Draw 9:
      - Netherlands 5–8 **Germany**
      - Scotland 7–5 Sweden
      - Czech Republic 8–3 France
      - **Denmark** 12–5 **Switzerland**
      - Russia 7–8 **Norway**
        - Final standings: Switzerland, Norway, Germany 7–2, Denmark 6–3, Scotland, Sweden 5–4, Czech Republic, France 3–6, Russia, Netherlands 1–8.
    - Playoffs:
      - 1 vs. 2: Switzerland 4–5 **Norway**
      - 3 vs. 4: Germany 5–10 **Denmark**
    - Tie-breaker game: France 3–8 **Czech Republic**
  - Women Playoffs:
    - 1 vs. 2: **Scotland** 9–4 Russia
    - 3 vs. 4: Sweden (Switzerland) 3–5 **Sweden**

==== Figure skating ====
- ISU Grand Prix:
  - Grand Prix Final and Junior Grand Prix Final in Beijing, China:
    - Junior Ice dance – Short Dance: (1) Victoria Sinitsina / Ruslan Zhiganshin (RUS) 55.58 (2) Ksenia Monko / Kirill Khaliavin (RUS) 55.50 (3) Alexandra Stepanova / Ivan Bukin (RUS) 53.59
    - Junior Ladies – Short Program: (1) Adelina Sotnikova (RUS) 57.27 (2) Elizaveta Tuktamysheva (RUS) 53.76 (3) Polina Shelepen (RUS) 53.26
    - Junior Men – Short Program: (1) Richard Dornbush (USA) 70.75 (2) Keegan Messing (USA) 68.52 (3) Yan Han (CHN) 67.29
    - Junior Pairs – Short Program: (1) Narumi Takahashi / Mervin Tran (JPN) 53.94 (2) Ksenia Stolbova / Fedor Klimov (RUS) 49.63 (3) Taylor Steele / Robert Schultz (CAN) 48.07

==== Handball ====
- European Women's Championship in Denmark and Norway: (teams in **bold** advance to the main round)
  - Group A in Aalborg:
    - Serbia 23–26 Spain
    - Romania 22–25 **Denmark**
      - Standings (after 2 games): Denmark 4 points, Romania, Spain 2, Serbia 0.
  - Group B in Aarhus:
    - Iceland 23–26 **Montenegro**
    - Russia 30–24 Croatia
      - Standings (after 2 games): Montenegro 4 points, Croatia, Russia 2, Iceland 0.

==== Nine-ball pool ====
- Mosconi Cup
  - Team Europe 1–2 Team USA
    - **Team Europe** 6–5 Team USA
    - Nick van den Berg (NLD) / Ralf Souquet (GER) 4–6 **Dennis Hatch** (USA) / **Rodney Morris** (USA)
    - Mika Immonen (FIN) 4–6 **Corey Deuel** (USA)

==== Rugby union ====
- Amlin Challenge Cup pool stage, matchday 3:
  - Pool 3: Montpellier (France) 39–14 (France) Bourgoin
    - Standings: Montpellier 13 points (3 matches), (England) Exeter Chiefs 5 (2), (England) Newcastle Falcons 4 (2), Bourgoin 1 (3).
- The Varsity Match in London: Oxford 21–10 Cambridge

==== Skeleton ====
- World Cup in Park City, United States:
  - Men: (gold) Aleksandr Tretyakov (RUS) 1:38.48 (49.37 / 49.11) (silver) Sandro Stielicke (GER) 1:38.49 (49.17 / 49.32) (bronze) Martins Dukurs (LAT) 1:38.50 (49.24 / 49.26)
    - Standings (after 3 of 8 events): (1) Tretyakov 635 points (2) Dukurs 609 (3) Kristan Bromley (GBR) 602
  - Women: (gold) Anja Huber (GER) 1:40.62 (50.58 / 50.04) (silver) Shelley Rudman (GBR) 1:40.80 (50.47 / 50.33) (bronze) Amy Gough (CAN) 1:41.02 (50.68 / 50.34)
    - Standings (after 3 of 8 events): (1) Huber 650 points (2) Rudman 604 (3) Mellisa Hollingsworth (CAN) 594

==== Snooker ====
- UK Championship in Telford, England, Quarter-finals:
  - Mark Joyce (ENG) 7–9 **Mark Williams** (WAL) [5]
  - **Shaun Murphy** (ENG) [8] 9–7 Neil Robertson (AUS) [2]

=== December 8, 2010 (Wednesday) ===
==== Basketball ====
- Euroleague Regular Season, matchday 8: (teams in **bold** advance to the Top 16; teams eliminated from Top 16 contention in ~~strike~~)
  - Group B: Spirou Basket (Belgium) 75–61 (Germany) Brose Baskets
    - Standings: (Greece) Olympiacos Piraeus 5–2, (Spain) Real Madrid, (Spain) Unicaja Málaga, (Italy) Virtus Roma 4–3, Spirou Basket 3–5, Brose Baskets 2–6.
  - Group C: ~~KK Cibona Zagreb~~ (Croatia) 66–82 (Italy) **Montepaschi Siena**
    - Standings: Montepaschi Siena 7–1, (Turkey) **Fenerbahçe Ülker** 6–1, (Spain) **Regal FC Barcelona** 5–2, (France) Cholet Basket 3–4, (Lithuania) Lietuvos Rytas 1–6, KK Cibona Zagreb 0–8.
  - Group D:
    - CSKA Moscow (Russia) 73–63 (Spain) Power Electronics Valencia
    - Armani Jeans Milano (Italy) 84–70 (Turkey) Efes Pilsen Istanbul
      - Standings: (Greece) Panathinaikos Athens, (Slovenia) Union Olimpija Ljubljana 5–2, Armani Jeans Milano, Efes Pilsen Istanbul 4–4, Power Electronics Valencia 3–5, CSKA Moscow 2–6.

==== Curling ====
- European Championships in Champéry, Switzerland:
  - Men draw 8: (teams in **bold** advance to the play-off; teams in italics qualify for the 2011 World Championship)
    - France 5–4 Scotland
    - Netherlands 2–8 Norway
    - **Switzerland** 6–4 Germany
    - Russia 4–5 Czech Republic
    - Denmark 4–7 Sweden
      - Standings (after 8 games): Switzerland 7–1, Germany, Norway 6–2, Denmark, Sweden 5–3, Scotland 4–4, France 3–5, Czech Republic 2–6, Netherlands, Russia 1–7.
  - Women draw 8:
    - Latvia 5–7 Germany
    - Russia 1–9 Scotland
    - Sweden 10–6 Norway
    - Netherlands 5–8 Denmark
    - Switzerland 8–5 Finland
  - Women draw 9: (teams in **bold** advance to the play-off; teams in italics qualify for the 2011 World Championship)
    - **Russia** 7–5 Norway
    - Germany 8–7 Finland
    - Denmark 4–3 Latvia
    - **Switzerland** 8–6 **Sweden**
    - Netherlands 3–8 **Scotland**
      - Final standings: Scotland 8–1, Russia, Switzerland 7–2, Sweden 6–3, Denmark, Norway 5–4, Germany 4–5, Latvia 2–7, Finland 1–8, Netherlands 0–9.

==== Football (soccer) ====
- AFF Suzuki Cup: (teams in **bold** advance to the semifinals)
  - Group B in Vietnam:
    - Myanmar 0–0 **Philippines**
    - **Vietnam** 1–0 Singapore
      - Final standings: Vietnam 6 points, Philippines 5, Singapore 4, Myanmar 1.
- FIFA Club World Cup in the United Arab Emirates:
  - Play-off for Quarterfinals: **Al-Wahda** (United Arab Emirates) 3–0 (Papua New Guinea) Hekari United
- UEFA Champions League group stage, matchday 6: (teams in **bold** advance to the Round of 16, teams in italics advance to the Europa League Round of 32)
  - Group E:
    - **Bayern Munich** (Germany) 3–0 (Switzerland) Basel
    - CFR Cluj (Romania) 1–1 (Italy) **Roma**
      - Final standings: Bayern Munich 15 points, Roma 10, Basel 6, CFR Cluj 4.
  - Group F:
    - **Marseille** (France) 1–0 (England) **Chelsea**
    - Žilina (Slovakia) 1–2 (Russia) Spartak Moscow
      - Final standings: Chelsea 15 points, Marseille 12, Spartak Moscow 9, Žilina 0.
  - Group G:
    - **Real Madrid** (Spain) 4–0 (France) Auxerre
    - **Milan** (Italy) 0–2 (Netherlands) Ajax
      - Final standings: Real Madrid 16 points, Milan 8, Ajax 7, Auxerre 3.
  - Group H:
    - **Arsenal** (England) 3–1 (Serbia) Partizan
    - **Shakhtar Donetsk** (Ukraine) 2–0 (Portugal) Braga
      - Final standings: Shakhtar Donetsk 15 points, Arsenal 12, Braga 9, Partizan 0.
- Copa Sudamericana Finals, second leg: (first leg score in parentheses)
  - **Independiente** (Argentina) 3–1 (0–2) (Brazil) Goiás. 3–3 on points, 3–3 on aggregate; Independiente win 5–3 on penalties.
    - Independiente win the Cup for the first time.

==== Handball ====
- European Women's Championship in Denmark and Norway: (teams in **bold** advance to the main round)
  - Group C in Larvik:
    - **Sweden** 33–25 Ukraine
    - Netherlands 27–30 Germany
      - Standings (after 2 games): Sweden 4 points, Netherlands, Germany 2, Ukraine 0.
  - Group D in Lillehammer:
    - France 18–21 **Hungary**
    - Slovenia 16–32 **Norway**
      - Standings (after 2 games): Hungary, Norway 4 points, Slovenia, France 0.

==== Snooker ====
- UK Championship in Telford, England, Quarter-finals:
  - **Mark Allen** (NIR) [12] 9–7 Stuart Bingham (ENG)
  - Stephen Maguire (SCO) [6] 7–9 **John Higgins** (SCO) [4]

==== Snowboarding ====
- World Cup in Lech am Arlberg, Austria:
  - Snowboard Cross men: (gold) Luca Matteotti (ITA) (silver) Alex Pullin (AUS) (bronze) Paul-Henri de Le Rue (FRA)
    - Snowboard Cross standings (after 2 of 7 races): (1) Nate Holland (USA) 1200 points (2) Matteotti 1160 (3) Mario Fuchs (AUT) 1100
    - Overall standings: (1) Holland 1200 points (2) Matteotti 1160 (3) Fuchs 1100
  - Snowboard Cross women: (gold) Dominique Maltais (CAN) (silver) Maëlle Ricker (CAN) (bronze) Aleksandra Zhekova (BUL)
    - Snowboard Cross standings (after 2 of 7 races): (1) Maltais 2000 points (2) Ricker 1600 (3) Zhekova 1000
    - Overall standings: (1) Maltais 2000 points (2) Ricker 1600 (3) Yekaterina Tudegesheva (RUS) & Zhekova 1000

=== December 7, 2010 (Tuesday) ===
==== Cricket ====
- England in Australia:
  - Ashes series:
    - Second Test in Adelaide, day 5: Australia 245 & 304 (99.1 overs; Graeme Swann 5/91); England 620/5d. **England win by an innings and 71 runs; lead 5-match series 1–0.**
- New Zealand in India:
  - 4th ODI in Bangalore: New Zealand 315/7 (50 overs); India 321/5 (48.5 overs; Yusuf Pathan 123*). **India win by 5 wickets; lead 5-match series 4–0.**

==== Curling ====
- European Championships in Champéry, Switzerland:
  - Men draw 6:
    - Russia 2–5 **Denmark**
    - Czech Republic 3–8 **Switzerland**
    - Sweden 4–6 **Norway**
    - Netherlands 2–6 **Scotland**
    - France 2–8 **Germany**
  - Men draw 7:
    - Norway 7–9 **Switzerland**
    - **France** 7–5 Russia
    - Denmark 2–5 **Scotland**
    - **Germany** 7–6 Sweden
    - **Czech Republic** 7–1 Netherlands
      - Standings (after 7 games): Germany, Switzerland 6–1, Denmark, Norway 5–2, Scotland, Sweden 4–3, France 2–5, Czech Republic, Netherlands, Russia 1–6.
  - Women draw 7:
    - **Scotland** 7–5 Sweden
    - **Latvia** 8–5 Netherlands
    - **Switzerland** 7–4 Germany
    - **Norway** 9–3 Finland
    - Denmark 1–7 **Russia**
      - Standings (after 7 games): Russia, Scotland 6–1, Norway, Sweden, Switzerland 5–2, Denmark 3–4, Germany, Latvia 2–5, Finland 1–6, Netherlands 0–7.

==== Football (soccer) ====
- AFF Suzuki Cup:
  - Group A in Indonesia: (teams in **bold** advance to the semifinals)
    - **Indonesia** 2–1 Thailand
    - **Malaysia** 5–1 Laos
      - Final standings: Indonesia 9 points, Malaysia 4, Thailand 2, Laos 1.
- UEFA Champions League group stage, matchday 6: (teams in **bold** advance to the Round of 16, teams in italics advance to the Europa League Round of 32)
  - Group A:
    - Twente (Netherlands) 3–3 (England) **Tottenham Hotspur**
    - Werder Bremen (Germany) 3–0 (Italy) **Internazionale**
      - Final standings: Tottenham Hotspur 11 points, Internazionale 10, Twente 6, Werder Bremen 5.
  - Group B:
    - **Lyon** (France) 2–2 (Israel) Hapoel Tel Aviv
    - Benfica (Portugal) 1–2 (Germany) **Schalke 04**
      - Final standings: Schalke 04 13 points, Lyon 10, Benfica 6, Hapoel Tel Aviv 5.
  - Group C:
    - **Manchester United** (England) 1–1 (Spain) **Valencia**
    - Bursaspor (Turkey) 1–1 (Scotland) Rangers
      - Final standings: Manchester United 14 points, Valencia 11, Rangers 6, Bursaspor 1.
  - Group D:
    - **Barcelona** (Spain) 2–0 (Russia) Rubin Kazan
    - **Copenhagen** (Denmark) 3–1 (Greece) Panathinaikos
      - Final standings: Barcelona 14 points, Copenhagen 10, Rubin Kazan 6, Panathinaikos 2.
      - Copenhagen becomes the first Danish team that advances to the knock-out stage of the Champions League.

==== Handball ====
- European Women's Championship in Denmark and Norway:
  - Group A in Aalborg:
    - Spain 26–30 Romania
    - Denmark 25–20 Serbia
  - Group B in Aarhus:
    - Montenegro 24–22 Russia
    - Croatia 35–25 Iceland
  - Group C in Larvik:
    - Germany 25–27 Sweden
    - Ukraine 13–25 Netherlands
  - Group D in Lillehammer:
    - Hungary 28–19 Slovenia
    - Norway 33–22 France

==== Snooker ====
- UK Championship in Telford, England, Last 16:
  - Ding Junhui (CHN) [1] 8–9 **Mark Allen** (NIR) [12]
  - **Stephen Maguire** (SCO) [6] 9–7 Mark Selby (ENG) [9]
  - Graeme Dott (SCO) [11] 8–9 **John Higgins** (SCO) [4]
  - Andrew Higginson (ENG) 5–9 **Neil Robertson** (AUS) [2]
  - Marco Fu (HKG) [16] 2–9 **Stuart Bingham** (ENG)
  - **Mark Joyce** (ENG) 9–7 Judd Trump (ENG)
  - Stephen Hendry (SCO) [10] 6–9 **Mark Williams** (WAL) [5]
  - **Shaun Murphy** (ENG) [8] 9–8 Ryan Day (WAL)

==== Snowboarding ====
- World Cup in Lech am Arlberg, Austria:
  - Snowboard Cross men: (gold) Nate Holland (USA) (silver) Tom Velisek (CAN) (bronze) Mario Fuchs (AUT)
    - Overall standings: (1) Holland & Andreas Prommegger (AUT) 1000 points (3) Roland Fischnaller (ITA) & Velisek 800
  - Snowboard Cross women: (gold) Dominique Maltais (CAN) (silver) Maëlle Ricker (CAN) (bronze) Yuka Fujimori (JPN)
    - Overall standings: (1) Maltais & Yekaterina Tudegesheva (RUS) 1000 points (3) Heidi Neururer (AUT) & Ricker 800

=== December 6, 2010 (Monday) ===
==== American football ====
- NFL Monday Night Football, Week 13: New England Patriots 45, New York Jets 3
- The Denver Broncos fire head coach Josh McDaniels and name running backs coach Eric Studesville as interim replacement.

==== Baseball ====
- Baseball Hall of Fame balloting:
  - In the first vote of a newly revamped Veterans Committee, which this year only considered individuals whose chief contributions occurred after 1972, Pat Gillick, former general manager of the Toronto Blue Jays, Baltimore Orioles, Seattle Mariners, and most recently the Philadelphia Phillies, is the only candidate elected. Gillick will formally enter the Hall in July 2011.

==== Cricket ====
- England in Australia:
  - Ashes series:
    - Second Test in Adelaide, day 4: Australia 245 & 238/4 (79.2 overs); England 620/5d (152 overs; Kevin Pietersen 227). Australia trail by 137 runs with 6 wickets remaining.
- Zimbabwe in Bangladesh:
  - 3rd ODI in Mirpur: Bangladesh 246/7 (50 overs); Zimbabwe 181 (48.1 overs). **Bangladesh win by 65 runs, lead the 5-match series 2–1**.

==== Curling ====
- European Championships in Champéry, Switzerland:
  - Men draw 4:
    - Germany 3–7 **Norway**
    - **Sweden** 6–1 France
    - **Scotland** 7–4 Czech Republic
    - **Switzerland** 8–7 Russia
    - Netherlands 2–8 **Denmark**
  - Men draw 5:
    - Czech Republic 6–9 **Sweden**
    - Denmark 2–8 **Germany**
    - Netherlands 5–7 **Russia**
    - **Norway** 6–2 France
    - **Switzerland** 8–6 Scotland
      - Standings (after 5 games): Denmark, Germany, Norway, Sweden, Switzerland 4–1, Scotland 2–3, France, Netherlands, Russia 1–4, Czech Republic 0–5.
  - Women draw 5:
    - **Denmark** 8–6 Finland
    - **Switzerland** 8–2 Norway
    - **Russia** 9–3 Netherlands
    - **Scotland** 10–2 Latvia
    - **Sweden** 6–1 Germany
  - Women draw 6:
    - Netherlands 2–10 **Switzerland**
    - **Denmark** 6–5 Sweden
    - Finland 6–9 **Scotland**
    - **Russia** 7–5 Germany
    - Latvia 1–10 **Norway**
      - Standings (after 6 games): Russia, Scotland, Sweden 5–1, Norway, Switzerland 4–2, Denmark, Germany 3–3, Finland, Latvia 1–5, Netherlands 0–6.

==== Snooker ====
- UK Championship in Telford, England, Last 32:
  - **Marco Fu** (HKG) [16] 9–7 Barry Hawkins (ENG)
  - Ali Carter (ENG) [3] 6–9 **Mark Joyce** (ENG)
  - **Stephen Hendry** (SCO) [10] 9–8 Jimmy White (ENG)
  - **Mark Williams** (WAL) [5] 9–3 Mark Davis (ENG)
  - Ronnie O'Sullivan (ENG) [7] 6–9 **Stuart Bingham** (ENG)
  - Jamie Cope (ENG) [14] 6–9 **Judd Trump** (ENG)
  - **Shaun Murphy** (ENG) [8] 9–5 Patrick Wallace (NIR)
  - Mark King (ENG) [15] 8–9 **Ryan Day** (WAL)

=== December 5, 2010 (Sunday) ===
==== Alpine skiing ====
- Men's World Cup in Beaver Creek, United States:
  - Giant slalom: (gold) Ted Ligety (USA) 2:37.67 (silver) Kjetil Jansrud (NOR) 2:38.49 (bronze) Marcel Hirscher (AUT) 2:38.91
    - Overall standings (after 5 of 38 races): (1) Mario Scheiber (AUT) 175 points (2) Didier Cuche (SUI) 158 (3) Aksel Lund Svindal (NOR) 156
- Women's World Cup in Lake Louise, Canada:
  - Super-G: (gold) Lindsey Vonn (USA) 1:20.72 (silver) Maria Riesch (GER) 1:21.55 (bronze) Julia Mancuso (USA) 1:21.61
    - Overall standings (after 7 of 38 races): (1) Riesch 514 points (2) Vonn 345 (3) Viktoria Rebensburg (GER) 224

==== American football ====
- NFL Week 13:
  - New York Giants 31, Washington Redskins 7
  - Kansas City Chiefs 10, Denver Broncos 6
  - Jacksonville Jaguars 17, Tennessee Titans 6
  - Green Bay Packers 34, San Francisco 49ers 16
  - Cleveland Browns 13, Miami Dolphins 10
  - Minnesota Vikings 38, Buffalo Bills 14
  - Chicago Bears 24, Detroit Lions 20
  - New Orleans Saints 34, Cincinnati Bengals 30
  - Oakland Raiders 28, San Diego Chargers 13
  - Seattle Seahawks 31, Carolina Panthers 14
  - Atlanta Falcons 28, Tampa Bay Buccaneers 24
  - St. Louis Rams 19, Arizona Cardinals 6
  - Dallas Cowboys 38, Indianapolis Colts 35 (OT)
  - Sunday Night Football: Pittsburgh Steelers 13, Baltimore Ravens 10

==== Auto racing ====
- V8 Supercars:
  - Sydney Telstra 500, Race 26 in Sydney, New South Wales: (1) Lee Holdsworth (AUS) (Holden Commodore) (2) Steven Richards (AUS) (Ford Falcon) (3) Shane van Gisbergen (NZL) (Ford Falcon)
    - Final drivers' championship standings: (1) James Courtney (AUS) (Ford Falcon) 3055 points (2) Jamie Whincup (AUS) (Holden Commodore) 2990 (3) Mark Winterbottom (AUS) (Ford Falcon) 2729
      - Courtney wins his first championship title.

==== Badminton ====
- BWF Super Series:
  - China Open Super Series in Shanghai:
    - Men's singles: **Chen Long** (CHN) def. Bao Chunlai (CHN) 9–21, 21–14, 21–16
    - Women's singles: **Jiang Yanjiao** (CHN) def. Wang Shixian (CHN) 21–16, 21–19
    - Men's doubles: **Jung Jae-sung** (KOR) / **Lee Yong-dae** (KOR) def. Chai Biao (CHN) / Zhang Nan (CHN) 21–15, 21–12
    - Women's doubles: **Cheng Shu** (CHN) / **Zhao Yunlei** (CHN) def. Ma Jin (CHN) / Zhong Qianxin (CHN) walkover
    - Mixed doubles: **Tao Jiaming** (CHN) / **Tian Qing** (CHN) def. Zhang Nan (CHN) / Zhao Yunlei (CHN) 21–18, 21–17

==== Biathlon ====
- World Cup 1 in Östersund, Sweden:
  - Women's 10 km Pursuit: (gold) Kaisa Mäkäräinen (FIN) 31:57.1 (0+0+0+0) (silver) Miriam Gössner (GER) 33:22.4 (0+1+1+1) (bronze) Helena Ekholm (SWE) 33:38.6 (0+1+0+1)
    - Overall standings (after 3 of 26 races): (1) Mäkäräinen 150 points (2) Ekholm 136 (3) Anna Carin Zidek (SWE) 135
  - Men's 12.5 km Pursuit: (gold) Ole Einar Bjørndalen (NOR) 35:47.7 (0+0+1+1) (silver) Emil Hegle Svendsen (NOR) 36:13.9 (0+0+1+2) (bronze) Jakov Fak (SLO) 36:48.4 (1+2+0+0)
    - Overall standings (after 3 of 26 races): (1) Svendsen 174 points (2) Bjørndalen 168 (3) Martin Fourcade (FRA) 136

==== Cricket ====
- England in Australia:
  - Ashes series:
    - Second Test in Adelaide, day 3: Australia 245; England 551/4 (143 overs; Kevin Pietersen 213*, Alastair Cook 148). England lead by 306 runs with 6 wickets remaining in the 1st innings.
- West Indies in Sri Lanka:
  - 3rd Test in Kandy, day 5: West Indies 303/8 (103.3 overs); Sri Lanka. **Match drawn; 3-match series drawn 0–0.**
- ICC Intercontinental Shield Final in Dubai, United Arab Emirates, day 4:
  - United Arab Emirates 79 & 427 (173.1 overs; Saqib Ali 160*, Sarel Burger 5/80); Namibia 320 & 187/4 (39.4 overs; Craig Williams 113*). **Namibia win by 6 wickets.**

==== Cross-country skiing ====
- World Cup in Düsseldorf, Germany:
  - Men's Team Sprint Freestyle: (gold) Norway II (Ola Vigen Hattestad, Anders Gløersen) 19:56.6 (silver) Sweden I (Mats Larsson, Emil Jönsson) 19:56.8 (bronze) Italy II (Fabio Pasini, David Hofer) 19:57.6
  - Women's Team Sprint Freestyle: (gold) Italy I (Magda Genuin, Arianna Follis) 10:41.1 (silver) Norway I (Maiken Caspersen Falla, Celine Brun-Lie) 10:42.0 (bronze) Canada (Daria Gaiazova, Chandra Crawford) 10:43.5

==== Curling ====
- European Championships in Champéry, Switzerland:
  - Men draw 3:
    - **Scotland** 8–6 Russia
    - **Germany** 7–5 Czech Republic
    - Norway 5–6 **Denmark**
    - France 3–4 **Netherlands**
    - Sweden 6–7 **Switzerland**
      - Standings (after 3 games): Denmark, Germany 3–0, Norway, Sweden, Switzerland 2–1, France, Netherlands, Scotland 1–2, Czech Republic, Russia 0–3.
  - Women draw 3:
    - **Germany** 11–8 Netherlands
    - Norway 3–6 **Denmark**
    - **Scotland** 6–5 Switzerland
    - Latvia 2–9 **Russia**
    - Finland 7–8 **Sweden**
  - Women draw 4:
    - **Switzerland** 8–4 Latvia
    - **Sweden** 9–7 Russia
    - Netherlands 3–6 **Finland**
    - Germany 3–4 **Norway**
    - **Scotland** 6–4 Denmark
      - Standings (after 4 games): Sweden 4–0, Norway, Russia, Scotland 3–1, Germany, Switzerland 2–2, Denmark, Finland, Latvia 1–3, Netherlands 0–4.

==== Equestrianism ====
- Four-in-hand driving:
  - FEI World Cup:
    - 4th competition in Budapest (CAI-W): (gold) Werner Ulrich (SUI) (silver) Boyd Exell (AUS) (bronze) Daniel Würgler (SUI)
- Show jumping:
  - FEI World Cup Central European League – South Sub-League:
    - 6th competition in Budapest (CSI 2*-W): (gold) Jerry Smit (ITA) on Luis della Caccia (silver) Francesca Arioldi (ITA) on Agadir (bronze) Make Stroman (GER) on Flashlight
  - CSI 5* Paris-Villepinte – Grand Prix: (gold) Marco Kutscher (GER) on Cash (silver) Christian Ahlmann (GER) on Taloubet Z (bronze) Simon Delestre (FRA) on Napoli du Ry

==== Football (soccer) ====
- AFF Suzuki Cup:
  - Group B in Hanoi, Vietnam:
    - Singapore 2–1 Myanmar
    - Philippines 2–0 Vietnam
      - Standings (after 2 matches): Philippines, Singapore 4 points, Vietnam 3, Myanmar 0.
- Caribbean Championship Final Tournament in Fort-de-France, Martinique:
  - Third Place Playoff: Grenada 0–1 (bronze) **Cuba**
  - Final: (silver) Guadeloupe 1–1 (4–5 pen.) (gold) **Jamaica**
    - Jamaica win the title for the second straight time and fifth overall.
- Arabian Gulf Cup Final in Aden, Yemen:
  - Kuwait 1–0 (a.e.t.) Saudi Arabia
    - Kuwait win the Cup for the tenth time after a 12 years break.
- (Brazil) Campeonato Brasileiro Série A, final matchday: (teams in **bold** qualify for Copa Libertadores)
  - **Fluminense** 1–0 Guarani
  - Goiás 1–1 **Corinthians**
  - **Cruzeiro** 2–1 Palmeiras
  - **Grêmio** 3–0 Botafogo
    - Final standings: Fluminense 71 points, Cruzeiro 69, Corinthians 68, Grêmio 63.
    - Fluminense win the Championship for the second time after a break of 26 years.
- (Chile) Chilean Primera División, final matchday: (teams in **bold** qualify for Copa Libertadores)
  - **Universidad Católica** 5–0 Everton
  - **Colo-Colo** 4–2 Universidad de Concepción
    - Final standings: Universidad Católica 74 points, Colo-Colo 71.
    - Universidad Católica win the Championship for the tenth time.
- (Ecuador) Campeonato Ecuatoriano de Fútbol Serie A Finals, first leg:
  - LDU Quito 2–0 Emelec
- (Mexico) Primera División de México Apertura Liguilla Final, second leg: (first leg score in parentheses)
  - **Monterrey** 3–0 (2–3) Santos Laguna. Monterrey win 5–3 on aggregate.
    - Monterrey win the title for the fourth time.

==== Golf ====
- LPGA Tour:
  - LPGA Tour Championship in Orlando, Florida:
    - Winner: Maria Hjorth (SWE) 283 (−5)
      - Hjorth wins her fourth LPGA Tour title, and first since 2007.

==== Luge ====
- World Cup in Winterberg, Germany:
  - Women' singles: (gold) Tatjana Hüfner (GER) 1:54.669 (57.654 / 57.015) (silver) Natalie Geisenberger (GER) 1:55.283 (57.854 / 57.429) (bronze) Alex Gough (CAN) 1:55.411 (57.859 / 57.552)
    - Standings (after 2 of 9 races): (1) Hüfner 200 points (2) Geisenberger 170 (3) Anke Wischnewski (GER) 120
  - Team relay: (gold) Germany 2:26.594 (47.291 / 49.561 / 49.561) (silver) Italy 2:27.037 (47.729 / 49.722 / 49.586) (bronze) Austria 2:27.152 (47.877 / 49.633 / 49.642)
    - Standings (after 2 of 6 races): (1) Germany 200 points (2) Italy 155 (3) Canada 135

==== Nordic combined ====
- World Cup in Trondheim, Norway:
  - HS 138 / 10 km: (gold) Jason Lamy-Chappuis (FRA) 24:35.5 (silver) Mikko Kokslien (NOR) 24:45.2 (bronze) Mario Stecher (AUT) 24:45.3
    - Overall standings (after 4 of 12 races): (1) Lamy-Chappuis 340 points (2) Kokslien 289 (3) Felix Gottwald (AUT) 260

==== Short track speed skating ====
- World Cup 3 in Changchun, China:
  - Men's:
    - 500 m: (gold) Semen Elistratov (RUS) 43.300 (silver) Remi Beaulieu (CAN) 43.410 (bronze) Ryosuke Sakazume (JPN) 43.596
      - Standings (after 4 of 8 races): (1) François-Louis Tremblay (CAN) 1512 points (2) Liang Wenhao (CHN) 1475 (3) Han Jialiang (CHN) 1328
    - 1000 m: (gold) Kim Byeong-jun (KOR) 1:25.474 (silver) Thibaut Fauconnet (FRA) 1:26.208 (bronze) Maxime Chataignier (FRA) 1:26.485
      - Standings (after 4 of 8 races): (1) Fauconnet 2800 points (2) Travis Jayner (USA) 1702 (3) Anthony Lobello Jr. (USA) 1664
    - 5000 m relay: (gold) Canada 6:54.065 (silver) United States 6:54.180 (bronze) South Korea 7:00.949
      - Standings (after 3 of 6 races): (1) Canada 3000 points (2) United States 2240 (3) China 1234
  - Women's:
    - 500 m: (gold) Zhao Nannan (CHN) 44.514 (silver) Fan Kexin (CHN) 44.556 (bronze) Kim Dam-min (KOR) 44.687
      - Standings (after 4 of 8 races): (1) Zhao 2410 points (2) Fan 2080 (3) Marianne St-Gelais (CAN) 2000
    - 1000 m: (gold) Yang Shin-young (KOR) 1:33.419 (silver) Marie-Ève Drolet (CAN) 1:34.343 (bronze) Zhou Yang (CHN) 1:34.447
      - Standings (after 4 of 8 races): (1) Katherine Reutter (USA) 1968 points (2) Zhou 2080 (3) Lana Gehring (USA) 1538
    - 3000 m relay: (gold) South Korea 4:16.249 (silver) China 4:16.361 (bronze) Netherlands 4:20.137
      - Standings (after 3 of 6 races): (1) China 2800 points (2) United States 1850 (3) Canada 1650

==== Ski jumping ====
- World Cup in Lillehammer, Norway:
  - HS 138: (gold) Thomas Morgenstern (AUT) 283.0 points (silver) Ville Larinto (FIN) 273.6 (bronze) Simon Ammann (SUI) 272.1
    - Standings (after 4 of 26 events): (1) Morgenstern 325 points (2) Larinto 252 (3) Andreas Kofler (AUT) 250

==== Snooker ====
- UK Championship in Telford, England, Last 32:
  - **Graeme Dott** (SCO) [11] 9–5 Martin Gould (ENG)
  - **John Higgins** (SCO) [4] 9–6 Stephen Lee (ENG)
  - Peter Ebdon (ENG) [13] 7–9 **Andrew Higginson** (ENG)
  - **Neil Robertson** (AUS) [2] 9–1 Rory McLeod (ENG)

==== Speed skating ====
- World Cup 4 in Changchun, China:
  - Men's:
    - 500 m: (gold) Tucker Fredricks (USA) 35.26 (silver) Jan Smeekens (NED) 35.27 (bronze) Lee Kyu-Hyeok (KOR) 35.32
      - Standings (after 6 of 12 races): (1) Joji Kato (JPN) 455 points (2) Lee Kang-Seok (KOR) 450 (3) Lee Kyu-Hyeok 365
    - 1000 m: (gold) Stefan Groothuis (NED) 1:09.39 (silver) Simon Kuipers (NED) 1:10.11 (bronze) Lee Kyu-Hyeok (KOR) 1:10.13
      - Standings (after 4 of 8 races): (1) Groothuis 330 points (2) Kuipers 290 (3) Lee 262
  - Women's:
    - 500 m: (gold) Lee Sang-hwa (KOR) 38.22 (silver) Yu Jing (CHN) 38.27 (bronze) Jenny Wolf (GER) 38.44
      - Standings (after 6 of 12 races): (1) Wolf 550 points (2) Lee 470 (3) Margot Boer (NED) 410
    - 1000 m: (gold) Christine Nesbitt (CAN) 1:16.55 (silver) Heather Richardson (USA) 1:17.59 (bronze) Nao Kodaira (JPN) 1:17.98
      - Standings (after 4 of 8 races): (1) Nesbitt 400 points (2) Richardson 290 (3) Margot Boer (NED) 260

==== Tennis ====
- Davis Cup Final in Belgrade, day 3: **Serbia** 3–2 France
  - Novak Djokovic (SRB) def. Gaël Monfils (FRA) 6–2, 6–2, 6–4
  - Viktor Troicki (SRB) def. Michaël Llodra (FRA) 6–2, 6–2, 6–3
    - Serbia win the Cup for the first time.

=== December 4, 2010 (Saturday) ===
==== Alpine skiing ====
- Men's World Cup in Beaver Creek, United States:
  - Super-G: (gold) Georg Streitberger (AUT) 1:17.18 (silver) Adrien Théaux (FRA) 1:17.29 (bronze) Didier Cuche (SUI) 1:17.31
    - Super-G standings (after 2 of 7 races): (1) Streitberger 118 points (2) Tobias Grünenfelder (SUI) 110 (3) Cuche 105
    - Overall standings (after 4 of 38 races): (1) Mario Scheiber (AUT) 175 points (2) Michael Walchhofer (AUT) 149 (3) Streitberger 136
- Women's World Cup in Lake Louise, Canada:
  - Downhill: (gold) Maria Riesch (GER) 1:29.60 (silver) Lindsey Vonn (USA) 1:29.70 (bronze) Dominique Gisin (SUI) 1:30.38
    - Downhill standings (after 2 of 9 races): (1) Riesch 200 points (2) Vonn 160 (3) Elisabeth Görgl (AUT) 105
    - Overall standings (after 6 of 38 races): (1) Riesch 434 points (2) Vonn 245 (3) Görgl 212

==== American football ====
- NCAA Division I FBS (unbeaten teams in **bold**):
  - Conference championship games (BCS ranking in parentheses):
    - SEC Championship Game in Atlanta: (1) **Auburn** 56, (19) South Carolina 17
      - The Tigers finish the regular season with a perfect 13–0 record, and secure a berth in the BCS National Championship Game.
    - Big 12 Championship Game in Arlington, Texas: (9) Oklahoma 23, (13) Nebraska 20
    - ACC Championship Game in Charlotte, North Carolina: (15) Virginia Tech 44, (21) Florida State 33
    - Conference USA Championship Game in Orlando, Florida: UCF 17, SMU 7
  - Other BCS Top 10 teams:
    - The Civil War: (2) **Oregon** 37, Oregon State 20
      - The Ducks finish the regular season with a perfect 12–0 record, and secure a berth in the BCS National Championship Game.
    - Idle: (3) **TCU**, (4) Stanford, (5) Wisconsin, (6) Ohio State, (7) Arkansas, (8) Michigan State, (10) LSU
  - Other games:
    - Big East Conference:
      - (24) West Virginia 35, Rutgers 14
      - Pittsburgh 28, Cincinnati 10
      - Connecticut 19, South Florida 16
        - The three winning teams all claim a share of the Big East title, with UConn winning the tiebreaker for the program's first-ever BCS berth.
    - Western Athletic Conference:
      - (11) Boise State 50, Utah State 14
      - (17) Nevada 35, Louisiana Tech 17
        - The Broncos and Wolf Pack share the Conference championship with Hawaiʻi.
    - Sun Belt Conference:
      - Troy 44, Florida Atlantic 7
      - Middle Tennessee 28, FIU 27
        - The Trojans and Golden Panthers share the title.
- NCAA Division I Football Championship (FCS) Second round (seeds in parentheses):
  - (1) Appalachian State 42, Western Illinois 14
  - Villanova 54, Stephen F. Austin 24
  - (5) Eastern Washington 37, Southeast Missouri State 17
  - North Dakota State 42, (4) Montana State 17
  - (3) Delaware 42, Lehigh 20
  - New Hampshire 45, Bethune–Cookman 20
  - Wofford 17, Jacksonville State 14
  - Georgia Southern 31, (2) William & Mary 15

==== Auto racing ====
- V8 Supercars:
  - Sydney Telstra 500, Race 25 in Sydney, New South Wales: (1) Jonathon Webb (AUS) (Ford Falcon) (2) Jason Bright (AUS) (Holden Commodore) (3) Rick Kelly (AUS) (Holden Commodore)
    - Drivers' championship standings (after 25 of 26 races): (1) James Courtney (AUS) (Ford Falcon) 2992 points (2) Jamie Whincup (AUS) (Holden Commodore) 2879 (3) Mark Winterbottom (AUS) (Ford Falcon) 2729

==== Biathlon ====
- World Cup 1 in Östersund, Sweden:
  - Men's 10 km Sprint: (gold) Emil Hegle Svendsen (NOR) 25:01.0 (1+0) (silver) Ole Einar Bjørndalen (NOR) 25:05.8 (0+0) (bronze) Martin Fourcade (FRA) 25:16.2 (0+0)
    - Overall standings (after 2 of 26 races): (1) Svendsen 120 points (2) Bjørndalen 108 (3) Fourcade 96

==== Bobsleigh ====
- World Cup in Calgary, Canada:
  - Four-man: (gold) Manuel Machata/Andreas Bredau/Michail Makarow/Christian Poser (GER) 1:47.99 (53.94 / 54.05) (silver) Karl Angerer/Gregor Bermbach/Alex Mann/Christian Friedrich (GER) 1:48.19 (54.05 / 54.14) (bronze) Maximilian Arndt/Rene Tiefert/Martin Putze/Alexander Rödiger (GER) 1:48.23 (54.07 / 54.16)
    - Standings (after 2 of 8 races): (1) Machata 425 points (2) Arndt 410 (3) Steve Holcomb (USA) 409

==== Cricket ====
- England in Australia:
  - Ashes series:
    - Second Test in Adelaide, day 2: Australia 245; England 317/2 (89 overs; Alastair Cook 136*). England lead by 72 runs with 8 wickets remaining in the 1st innings.
- New Zealand in India:
  - 3rd ODI in Vadodara: New Zealand 224/9 (50 overs); India 229/1 (39.3 overs; Gautam Gambhir 126*). **India win by 9 wickets; lead 5-match series 3–0.**
- West Indies in Sri Lanka:
  - 3rd Test in Kandy, day 4: West Indies 303/8 (103.3 overs); Sri Lanka.
- ICC Intercontinental Cup Final in Dubai, United Arab Emirates, day 3:
  - Scotland 212 & 82 (47.3 overs); Afghanistan 171 & 124/3 (26.4 overs). **Afghanistan win by 7 wickets.**
    - Afghanistan win the Cup for the first time.
- ICC Intercontinental Shield Final in Dubai, United Arab Emirates, day 3:
  - United Arab Emirates 79 & 403/8 (164 overs; Saqib Ali 139*, Sarel Burger 5/80); Namibia 320. United Arab Emirates lead by 162 runs with 2 wickets remaining.

==== Cross-country skiing ====
- World Cup in Düsseldorf, Germany:
  - Men's Sprint Freestyle: (gold) Emil Jönsson (SWE) (silver) Fulvio Scola (ITA) (bronze) Øystein Pettersen (NOR)
    - Sprint standings (after 2 of 11 races): (1) Jönsson 130 points (2) Scola 88 (3) John Kristian Dahl (NOR) 86
    - Overall standings (after 6 of 31 races): (1) Alexander Legkov (RUS) 318 points (2) Dario Cologna (SUI) 311 (3) Marcus Hellner (SWE) 265
  - Women's Sprint Freestyle: (gold) Arianna Follis (ITA) (silver) Kikkan Randall (USA) (bronze) Vesna Fabjan (SLO)
    - Sprint standings (after 2 of 11 races): (1) Follis 130 points (2) Randall 80 (3) Fabjan 60
    - Overall standings (after 6 of 31 races): (1) Marit Bjørgen (NOR) 440 points (2) Charlotte Kalla (SWE) 311 (3) Justyna Kowalczyk (POL) 309

==== Curling ====
- European Championships in Champéry, Switzerland:
  - Men draw 1:
    - **Sweden** 8–3 Netherlands
    - **Norway** 4–1 Scotland
    - **France** 7–1 Switzerland
    - Czech Republic 7–8 **Denmark**
    - **Germany** 7–2 Russia
  - Men draw 2:
    - **Denmark** 6–3 France
    - **Switzerland** 5–3 Netherlands
    - Russia 6–7 **Sweden**
    - Scotland 5–9 **Germany**
    - **Norway** 7–3 Czech Republic
  - Women draw 1:
    - Finland 2–9 **Russia**
    - **Scotland** 8–5 Germany
    - Latvia 3–10 **Sweden**
    - Denmark 5–6 **Switzerland**
    - **Norway** 7–5 Denmark
  - Women draw 2:
    - **Norway** 6–5 Scotland
    - Finland 8–9 **Latvia**
    - **Germany** 9–3 Denmark
    - **Sweden** 5–4 Netherlands
    - **Russia** 8–5 Switzerland

==== Equestrianism ====
- Show jumping:
  - FEI World Cup North American League – East Coast:
    - 11th competition in Wellington (CSI 2*-W): (gold) Paulo Santana (BRA) on Taloubet (silver) Charlie Jayne (USA) on Athena (bronze) Kate Levy (AUS) on Lirving du Volsin

==== Football (soccer) ====
- AFF Suzuki Cup: (team in **bold** advance to the semi-finals)
  - Group A in Jakarta, Indonesia:
    - Thailand 0–0 Malaysia
    - Laos 0–6 **Indonesia**
      - Standings (after 2 matches): Indonesia 6 points, Thailand 2, Malaysia, Laos 1.
- CAF Confederation Cup Final, second leg: (first leg score in parentheses)
  - CS Sfaxien (Tunisia) 2–3 (0–0) (Morocco) **FUS Rabat**. FUS Rabat win 3–2 on aggregate.
    - FUS Rabat win the Cup for the first time.
- OFC Champions League Group stage, matchday 3:
  - Group A: Amicale (Vanuatu) 2–0 (Solomon Islands) Koloale
    - Standings: Amicale 6 points (3 matches), (Fiji) Lautoka 6 (2), (Papua New Guinea) PRK Hekari United 3 (2), Koloale 0 (3).
  - Group B: AS Magenta (New Caledonia) 1–1 (New Zealand) Waitakere United
    - Standings (after 3 matches): (New Zealand) Auckland City FC, Waitakere United 5 points, AS Magenta 4, (French Polynesia) AS Tefana 1.

==== Luge ====
- World Cup in Winterberg, Germany:
  - Men's singles: (gold) Armin Zöggeler (ITA) 1:44.322 (52.183 / 52.139) (silver) David Möller (GER) 1:44.541 (52.256 / 52.285) (bronze) Julian von Schleinitz (GER) 1:44.601 (52.281 / 52.320)
    - Standings (after 2 of 9 races): (1) Zöggeler 170 points (2) Möller 170 (3) Felix Loch (GER) 160
  - Doubles: (gold) Tobias Wendl/Tobias Arlt (GER) 1:26.832 (43.415 / 43.417) (silver) Christian Oberstolz/Patrick Gruber (ITA) 1:26.842 (43.412 / 43.430) (bronze) Christian Niccum/Jayson Terdiman (USA) 1:27.159 (43.657 / 43.502)
    - Standings (after 2 of 9 races): (1) Oberstolz/Gruber 170 points (2) Wendl/Arlt 160 (3) Niccum/Terdiman 125

==== Nordic combined ====
- World Cup in Trondheim, Norway:
  - HS 138 / 10 km: (gold) Mikko Kokslien (NOR) 24:16.6 (silver) Jason Lamy-Chappuis (FRA) 24:25.0 (bronze) Felix Gottwald (AUT) 24:29.9
    - Overall standings (after 3 of 12 races): (1) Lamy-Chappuis 240 points (2) Gottwald 210 (3) Kokslien 209

==== Rugby union ====
- IRB Sevens World Series:
  - Dubai Sevens in Dubai, United Arab Emirates:
    - Shield: **Kenya** 26–0 France
    - Bowl: **Argentina** 21–0 Zimbabwe
    - Plate: **South Africa** 19–12 Australia
    - Cup: Samoa 21–29 **England**
- End of year tests:
  - Week 7:
    - Barbarians 26–20 South Africa in London

==== Short track speed skating ====
- World Cup 3 in Changchun, China:
  - Men's:
    - 500m: (gold) Han Jialiang (CHN) 42.447 (silver) Thibaut Fauconnet (FRA) 42.910 (bronze) Ryan Bedford (USA) 43.002
      - Standings (after 3 of 8 races): (1) François-Louis Tremblay (CAN) 1512 points (2) Liang Wenhao (CHN) 1475 (3) Charles Hamelin (CAN) 1210
    - 1500m: (gold) Lee Ho-Suk (KOR) 2:26.632 (silver) Liu Xianwei (CHN) 2:26.779 (bronze) Jeff Simon (USA) 2:26.880
      - Standings (after 4 of 8 races): (1) Simon 1850 points (2) Guillaume Bastille (CAN) 1747 (3) Maxime Chataignier (FRA) 1307
  - Women's:
    - 500m: (gold) Zhao Nannan (CHN) 44.100 (silver) Liu Qiuhong (CHN) 44.228 (bronze) Fan Kexin (CHN) 44.388
      - Standings (after 3 of 8 races): (1) Marianne St-Gelais (CAN) 2000 points (2) Arianna Fontana (ITA) 1600 (3) Zhao 1578
    - 1500m: (gold) Katherine Reutter (USA) 2:27.904 (silver) Cho Ha-Ri (KOR) 2:28.008 (bronze) Biba Sakurai (JPN) 2:28.394
      - Standings (after 4 of 8 races): (1) Reutter 2800 points (2) Zhou Yang (CHN) 2440 (3) Sakurai 1490

==== Ski jumping ====
- World Cup in Lillehammer, Norway:
  - HS 138: (gold) Thomas Morgenstern (AUT) 281.4 points (silver) Johan Remen Evensen (NOR) 276.9 (bronze) Tom Hilde (NOR) 272.8
    - Standings (after 3 of 26 events): (1) Morgenstern 225 points (2) Andreas Kofler (AUT) 200 (3) Ville Larinto (FIN) 172

==== Snooker ====
- UK Championship in Telford, England, Last 32:
  - **Ding Junhui** (CHN) [1] 9–4 Matthew Stevens (WAL)
  - **Mark Allen** (NIR) [12] 9–5 Tom Ford (ENG)
  - **Stephen Maguire** (SCO) [6] 9–6 Ken Doherty (IRE)
  - **Mark Selby** (ENG) [9] 9–6 Ricky Walden (ENG)

==== Speed skating ====
- World Cup 4 in Changchun, China:
  - Men's:
    - 500 m: (gold) Lee Kang-seok (KOR) 35.10 (silver) Joji Kato (JPN) 35.25 (bronze) Keiichiro Nagashima (JPN) 35.30
      - Standings (after 5 of 12 races): (1) Kato 410 points (2) Lee 390 (3) Nagashima 296
    - 1000 m: (gold) Stefan Groothuis (NED) 1:09.57 (silver) Lee Kyu-Hyeok (KOR) 1:10.10 (bronze) Simon Kuipers (NED) 1:10.27
      - Standings (after 3 of 8 races): (1) Groothuis 230 points (2) Kuipers 210 (3) Shani Davis (USA) 200
  - Women's:
    - 500 m: (gold) Lee Sang-hwa (KOR) 38.24 (silver) Jenny Wolf (GER) 38.29 (bronze) Nao Kodaira (JPN) 38.51
      - Standings (after 5 of 12 races): (1) Wolf 480 points (2) Lee 370 (3) Margot Boer (NED) 360
    - 1000 m: (gold) Christine Nesbitt (CAN) 1:16.07 (silver) Heather Richardson (USA) 1:17.49 (bronze) Judith Hesse (GER) 1:18.04
      - Standings (after 3 of 8 races): (1) Nesbitt 300 points (2) Richardson 210 (3) Margot Boer (NED) 210

==== Tennis ====
- Davis Cup Final in Belgrade, day 2: Serbia 1–2 France
  - Arnaud Clément / Michaël Llodra (FRA) def. Viktor Troicki / Nenad Zimonjić (SRB) 3–6, 6–7(3), 6–4, 7–5, 6–4

=== December 3, 2010 (Friday) ===
==== Alpine skiing ====
- Men's World Cup in Beaver Creek, United States:
  - Downhill: Cancelled due to strong winds.
- Women's World Cup in Lake Louise, Canada:
  - Downhill: (gold) Maria Riesch (GER) 1:28.96 (silver) Lindsey Vonn (USA) 1:29.08 (bronze) Elisabeth Görgl (AUT) 1:29.17
    - Overall standings (after 5 of 38 races): (1) Riesch 334 points (2) Tanja Poutiainen (FIN) 196 (3) Viktoria Rebensburg (GER) 180

==== American football ====
- NCAA Division I FBS (BCS ranking in parentheses):
  - MAC Championship Game in Detroit: Miami (OH) 26, (25) Northern Illinois 21
    - The RedHawks win the championship for the first time since 2003 and 15th time overall.

==== Biathlon ====
- World Cup 1 in Östersund, Sweden:
  - Women's 7.5 km Sprint: (gold) Kaisa Mäkäräinen (FIN) 22:42.1 (0+0) (silver) Miriam Gössner (GER) 23:00.8 (0+0) (bronze) Darya Domracheva (BLR) 23:29.2 (0+1)
    - Overall standings (after 2 of 26 races): (1) Anna Carin Zidek (SWE) 92 points (2) Mäkäräinen 90 (3) Helena Ekholm (SWE) 88

==== Bobsleigh ====
- World Cup in Calgary, Canada:
  - Two-man: (gold) Karl Angerer/Gregor Bermbach (GER) 1:50.57 (55.07 / 55.50) (silver) Manuel Machata/Andreas Bredau (GER) 1:50.77 (55.25 / 55.52) (silver) Patrice Servelle/Lascelles Brown (MON) 1:50.77 (55.28 / 55.49)
    - Standings (after 2 of 8 races): (1) Machata & Angerer 435 points (3) Lyndon Rush (CAN) 394
  - Women: (gold) Cathleen Martini/Berit Wiacker (GER) 1:53.57 (57.01 / 56.56) (silver) Sandra Kiriasis/Christin Senkel (GER) 1:53.89 (56.92 / 56.97) (bronze) Helen Upperton/Shelley-Ann Brown (CAN) 1:54.08 (57.11 / 56.97)
    - Standings (after 2 of 8 races): (1) Kiriasis 435 points (2) Martini 417 (3) Kaillie Humphries (CAN) 392

==== Cricket ====
- England in Australia:
  - Ashes series:
    - Second Test in Adelaide, day 1: Australia 245 (85.5 overs); England 1/0 (1 over). England trail by 244 runs with 10 wickets remaining in the 1st innings.
- West Indies in Sri Lanka:
  - 3rd Test in Kandy, day 3: West Indies 244/5 (81 overs); Sri Lanka.
- Zimbabwe in Bangladesh:
  - 2nd ODI in Mirpur: Zimbabwe 191 (46.2 overs; Abdur Razzak 5/30); Bangladesh 194/4 (39.4 overs). **Bangladesh win by 6 wickets; 5-match series level 1–1.**
- ICC Intercontinental Cup Final in Dubai, United Arab Emirates, day 2:
  - Scotland 212 & 64/6 (38.3 overs); Afghanistan 171 (60.1 overs). Scotland lead by 105 runs with 4 wickets remaining.
- ICC Intercontinental Shield Final in Dubai, United Arab Emirates, day 2:
  - United Arab Emirates 79 & 200/5 (77 overs); Namibia 320 (75.2 overs). United Arab Emirates trail by 41 runs with 5 wickets remaining.

==== Football (soccer) ====
- Caribbean Championship Final Tournament in Martinique:
  - Semifinals in Fort-de-France:
    - Cuba 1–2 **Guadeloupe**
    - **Jamaica** 2–1 (a.e.t.) Grenada
- OFC Champions League Group stage, matchday 3:
  - Group B: AS Tefana (French Polynesia) 1–1 (New Zealand) Auckland City FC

==== Tennis ====
- Davis Cup Final in Belgrade, day 1: Serbia 1–1 France
  - Gaël Monfils (FRA) def. Janko Tipsarević (SRB) 6–1, 7–6(4), 6–0
  - Novak Djokovic (SRB) def. Gilles Simon (FRA) 6–3, 6–1, 7–5

=== December 2, 2010 (Thursday) ===
==== American football ====
- NFL Thursday Night Football, Week 13: Philadelphia Eagles 34, Houston Texans 24
- NCAA Division I FBS BCS Top 25:
  - Territorial Cup: Arizona State 30, (23) Arizona 29 (2OT)

==== Basketball ====
- Euroleague Regular Season, matchday 7 (teams in **bold** advance to the Top 16):
  - Group A: Žalgiris Kaunas (Lithuania) 68–71 (Israel) **Maccabi Tel Aviv**
    - Standings (after 7 games): Maccabi Tel Aviv 6–1, Žalgiris Kaunas, (Serbia) Partizan Belgrade 4–3, (Russia) Khimki Moscow 3–4, (Spain) Caja Laboral, (Poland) Asseco Prokom Gdynia 2–5.
  - Group B:
    - Olympiacos Piraeus (Greece) 86–69 (Germany) Brose Baskets
    - Unicaja Málaga (Spain) 75–71 (Spain) Real Madrid
    - Virtus Roma (Italy) 95–83 (Belgium) Spirou Basket
      - Standings (after 7 games): Olympiacos Piraeus 5–2, Real Madrid, Unicaja Málaga, Virtus Roma 4–3, Brose Baskets, Spirou Basket 2–5.
  - Group C: **Regal FC Barcelona** (Spain) 76–62 (France) Cholet Basket
    - Standings (after 7 games): (Turkey) **Fenerbahçe Ülker**, (Italy) **Montepaschi Siena** 6–1, Regal FC Barcelona 5–2, Cholet Basket 3–4, (Lithuania) Lietuvos Rytas 1–6, (Croatia) KK Cibona Zagreb 0–7.
  - Group D:
    - Power Electronics Valencia (Spain) 62–56 (Turkey) Efes Pilsen Istanbul
    - Union Olimpija Ljubljana (Slovenia) 82–75 (Italy) Armani Jeans Milano
      - Standings (after 7 games): Union Olimpija Ljubljana, (Greece) Panathinaikos Athens 5–2, Efes Pilsen Istanbul 4–3, Armani Jeans Milano, Power Electronics Valencia 3–4, (Russia) CSKA Moscow 1–6.

==== Biathlon ====
- World Cup 1 in Östersund, Sweden:
  - Men's 20 km Individual: (gold) Emil Hegle Svendsen (NOR) 55:07.7 (0+1+0+1) (silver) Ole Einar Bjørndalen (NOR) 55:26.8 (0+0+0+2) (bronze) Martin Fourcade (FRA) 55:45.5 (0+1+0+0)

==== Bobsleigh ====
- World Cup in Calgary, Canada:
  - Team: (gold) Germany I (Frank Rommel, Stefanie Szczurek, Kristin Steinert, Anja Huber, Manuel Machata, Florian Becke) 3:47.86 (56.76 / 57.21 / 58.22 / 55.67) (silver) Canada I (Jon Montgomery, Mellissa These, Baadsvik Emily, Amy Gough, Lyndon Rush, Justin Wilkinson) 3:49.35 (57.26 / 57.53 / 58.82 / 55.74) (bronze) Russia II (Sergey Chudinov, Anastasiya Skulkina, Yana Vinokhodova, Olga Potelitcina, Alexey Gorlachev, Ilya Ivanov) 3:49.61 (56.68 / 58.10 / 59.00 / 55.83)

==== Cricket ====
- West Indies in Sri Lanka:
  - 3rd Test in Kandy, day 2: West Indies 244/5 (81 overs); Sri Lanka.
- ICC Intercontinental Cup Final in Dubai, United Arab Emirates, day 1:
  - Scotland 212 (88.4 overs; Neil McCallum 104*, Hamid Hassan 5/45); Afghanistan 18/1 (4 overs). Afghanistan trail by 194 runs with 9 wickets remaining in the 1st innings.
- ICC Intercontinental Shield Final in Dubai, United Arab Emirates, day 1:
  - United Arab Emirates 79 (25.3 overs, Bernie Burger 7/38); Namibia 267/3 (61 overs; Craig Williams 116). Namibia lead by 188 runs with 7 wickets remaining in the 1st innings.

==== Football (soccer) ====
- FIFA Executive Committee selects the 2018 and 2022 FIFA World Cup hosts:
  - 2018: Russia win the rights to the tournament, amassing an unassailable 13 of the 22 votes in the second round.
  - 2022: Qatar win the rights to the tournament, defeating the United States by 14 votes to 8 in the final round.
    - Russia and Qatar are both first-time hosts and are the largest (by area) and smallest (by both area and population) countries respectively to host the FIFA World Cup, and also the first hosts from Eastern Europe or Western Asia.
- AFF Suzuki Cup:
  - Group B in Hanoi, Vietnam:
    - Singapore 1–1 Philippines
    - Vietnam 7–1 Myanmar
- UEFA Europa League group stage, matchday 5: (teams in **bold** advance to the Round of 32)
  - Group D:
    - **Villarreal** (Spain) 3–0 (Croatia) Dinamo Zagreb
    - PAOK (Greece) 1–1 (Belgium) Club Brugge
      - Standings (after 5 matches): Villarreal 9 points, PAOK 8, Dinamo Zagreb 7, Club Brugge 3.
  - Group E:
    - Sheriff Tiraspol (Moldova) 1–1 (Netherlands) AZ
    - **BATE** (Belarus) 1–4 (Ukraine) **Dynamo Kyiv**
      - Standings (after 5 matches): Dynamo Kyiv, BATE 10 points, AZ, Sheriff Tiraspol 4.
  - Group F:
    - Palermo (Italy) 2–2 (Czech Republic) **Sparta Prague**
    - **CSKA Moscow** (Russia) 5–1 (Switzerland) Lausanne-Sport
      - Standings (after 5 matches): CSKA Moscow 15 points, Sparta Prague 8, Palermo 4, Lausanne-Sport 1.
  - Group J:
    - Borussia Dortmund (Germany) 3–0 (Ukraine) Karpaty Lviv
    - **Paris Saint-Germain** (France) 4–2 (Spain) Sevilla
      - Standings (after 5 matches): Paris Saint-Germain 11 points, Sevilla 9, Borussia Dortmund 8, Karpaty Lviv 0.
  - Group K:
    - Utrecht (Netherlands) 3–3 (Italy) Napoli
    - Steaua București (Romania) 1–1 (England) **Liverpool**
      - Standings (after 5 matches): Liverpool 9 points, Steaua București 6, Napoli, Utrecht 4.
  - Group L:
    - CSKA Sofia (Bulgaria) 1–2 (Turkey) **Beşiktaş**
    - Rapid Wien (Austria) 1–3 (Portugal) **Porto**
      - Standings (after 5 matches): Porto 13 points, Beşiktaş 10, Rapid Wien, CSKA Sofia 3.
- (Mexico) Primera División de México Apertura Liguilla Final, first leg:
  - Santos Laguna 3–2 Monterrey

==== Skeleton ====
- World Cup in Calgary, Canada:
  - Men: (gold) Martins Dukurs (LAT) 1:52.14 (56.10 / 56.04) (silver) Aleksandr Tretyakov (RUS) 1:52.23 (56.17 / 56.06) (bronze) Kristan Bromley (GBR) 1:52.98 (56.54 / 56.44)
    - Standings (after 2 of 8 races): (1) Tretyakov & Bromley 410 points (3) Dukurs 409
  - Women: (gold) Anja Huber (GER) 1:55.84 (57.93 / 57.91) (silver) Shelley Rudman (GBR) 1:56.61 (58.15 / 58.46) (bronze) Amy Gough (CAN) 1:56.89 (58.35 / 58.54)
    - Standings (after 2 of 8 races): (1) Huber 425 points (2) Marion Thees (GER) 409 (3) Mellisa Hollingsworth (CAN) 402
  - Team: (gold) Germany I (Frank Rommel, Stefanie Szczurek, Kristin Steinert, Anja Huber, Manuel Machata, Florian Becke) 3:47.86 (56.76 / 57.21 / 58.22 / 55.67) (silver) Canada I (Jon Montgomery, Mellissa These, Baadsvik Emily, Amy Gough, Lyndon Rush, Justin Wilkinson) 3:49.35 (57.26 / 57.53 / 58.82 / 55.74) (bronze) Russia II (Sergey Chudinov, Anastasiya Skulkina, Yana Vinokhodova, Olga Potelitcina, Alexey Gorlachev, Ilya Ivanov) 3:49.61 (56.68 / 58.10 / 59.00 / 55.83)

=== December 1, 2010 (Wednesday) ===
==== Basketball ====
- Euroleague Regular Season, matchday 7 (teams in **bold** advance to the Top 16):
  - Group A:
    - Khimki Moscow (Russia) 92–65 (Serbia) Partizan Belgrade
    - Caja Laboral (Spain) 75–81 (Poland) Asseco Prokom Gdynia
      - Standings: (Israel) Maccabi Tel Aviv 5–1, (Lithuania) Žalgiris Kaunas 4–2, Partizan 4–3, Khimki Moscow 3–4, Caja Laboral, Asseco Prokom Gdynia 2–5.
  - Group C:
    - **Fenerbahçe Ülker** (Turkey) 100–70 (Croatia) KK Cibona Zagreb
    - **Montepaschi Siena** (Italy) 90–72 (Lithuania) Lietuvos Rytas
      - Standings: Fenerbahçe Ülker, Montepaschi Siena 6–1, (Spain) Regal FC Barcelona 4–2, (France) Cholet Basket 3–3, Lietuvos Rytas 1–6, Cibona Zagreb 0–7.
  - Group D: CSKA Moscow (Russia) 68–72 (Greece) Panathinaikos Athens
    - Standings: Panathinaikos 5–2, (Turkey) Efes Pilsen Istanbul, (Slovenia) Union Olimpija Ljubljana 4–2, (Italy) Armani Jeans Milano 3–3, (Spain) Power Electronics Valencia 2–4, CSKA Moscow 1–6.

==== Biathlon ====
- World Cup 1 in Östersund, Sweden:
  - Women's 15 km Individual: (gold) Anna Carin Olofsson-Zidek (SWE) 45:26.1 (0+0+0+0) (silver) Marie-Laure Brunet (FRA) 45:35.0 (1+0+0+1) (bronze) Helena Ekholm (SWE) 46:08.8 (1+0+0+1)

==== Cricket ====
- West Indies in Sri Lanka:
  - 3rd Test in Kandy, day 1: West Indies 134/2 (40 overs); Sri Lanka.
- New Zealand in India:
  - 2nd ODI in Jaipur: New Zealand 258/8 (50 overs); India 259/2 (43 overs, Gautam Gambhir 138*). **India win by 8 wickets; lead 5-match series 2–0.**
- Zimbabwe in Bangladesh:
  - 1st ODI in Mirpur: Zimbabwe 209 (49 overs); Bangladesh 200 (49 overs). **Zimbabwe win by 9 runs; lead 5-match series 1–0.**

==== Football (soccer) ====
- Caribbean Championship Final Tournament in Martinique: (teams in **bold** advance to the semi-finals and qualify for 2011 CONCACAF Gold Cup)
  - Group I in Riviére-Pilote:
    - **Guadeloupe** 1–0 Antigua and Barbuda
    - Guyana 0–4 **Jamaica**
      - Final standings: Jamaica 9 points, Guadeloupe 4, Antigua and Barbuda 3, Guyana 1.
- AFF Suzuki Cup:
  - Group A in Jakarta, Indonesia:
    - Thailand 2–2 Laos
    - Indonesia 5–1 Malaysia
- UEFA Europa League group stage, matchday 5: (teams in **bold** advance to the Round of 32)
  - Group A:
    - **Lech Poznań** (Poland) 1–1 (Italy) Juventus
    - **Manchester City** (England) 3–0 (Austria) Red Bull Salzburg
      - Standings (after 5 matches): Manchester City 10 points, Lech Poznań 8, Juventus 5, Red Bull Salzburg 2.
  - Group B:
    - Atlético Madrid (Spain) 2–3 (Greece) Aris
    - Rosenborg (Norway) 0–1 (Germany) **Bayer Leverkusen**
      - Standings (after 5 matches): Bayer Leverkusen 11 points, Aris, Atlético Madrid 7, Rosenborg 3.
  - Group C:
    - Gent (Belgium) 1–0 (Bulgaria) Levski Sofia
    - **Sporting CP** (Portugal) 1–0 (France) Lille
      - Standings (after 5 matches): Sporting CP 12 points, Gent 7, Lille 5, Levski Sofia 4.
  - Group G:
    - Hajduk Split (Croatia) 1–3 (Greece) AEK Athens
    - **Zenit St. Petersburg** (Russia) 3–1 (Belgium) Anderlecht
      - Standings (after 5 matches): Zenit St. Petersburg 15 points, AEK Athens 7, Anderlecht 4, Hajduk Split 3.
  - Group H:
    - Odense (Denmark) 1–1 (Spain) Getafe
    - **Young Boys** (Switzerland) 4–2 (Germany) **Stuttgart**
      - Standings (after 5 matches): Stuttgart 12 points, Young Boys 9, Getafe, Odense 4.
  - Group I:
    - **Metalist Kharkiv** (Ukraine) 2–1 (Hungary) Debrecen
    - Sampdoria (Italy) 1–2 (Netherlands) **PSV Eindhoven**
      - Standings (after 5 matches): PSV Eindhoven 13 points, Metalist Kharkiv 10, Sampdoria 5, Debrecen 0.
- Copa Sudamericana Finals, first leg:
  - Goiás (Brazil) 2–0 (Argentina) Independiente

==== Rugby union ====
- New Zealand sweeps the three major IRB Awards in the last of this year's awards cycle:
  - The All Blacks are named Team of the Year for the fourth time.
  - Head coach Graham Henry is named Coach of the Year for a fourth time.
  - Captain Richie McCaw is named Player of the Year for a third time, and is also the first player to claim the award in consecutive years.

==== Ski jumping ====
- World Cup in Kuopio, Finland:
  - HS 127: (gold) Ville Larinto (FIN) 240.9 points (silver) Matti Hautamäki (FIN) 240.8 (bronze) Simon Ammann (SUI) 238.3
    - Standings (after 2 of 26 events): (1) Andreas Kofler (AUT) 150 points (2) Larinto 140 (3) Thomas Morgenstern (AUT) & Hautamäki 125
