= November 2010 in sports =

<<	November 2010					>>
Su	Mo	Tu	We	Th	Fr	Sa
	1	2	3	4	5	6
7	8	9	10	11	12	13
14	15	16	17	18	19	20
21	22	23	24	25	26	27
28	29	30
Sports

This list shows notable sports-related deaths, events, and notable outcomes that occurred in November of 2010.

== Deaths in November ==
Deaths in November 2010:

- 2: Andy Irons
- 4: Sparky Anderson
- 19: Pat Burns

== Current sporting seasons ==
=== American football 2010 ===
- National Football League
- NCAA Division I FBS
- NCAA Division I FCS

=== Auto racing 2010 ===
- V8 Supercar
- FIA GT1 World Championship
- Deutsche Tourenwagen Masters

=== Basketball 2010 ===
- NBA
- NCAA Division I men
- Euroleague
- EuroLeague Women
- Eurocup
- EuroChallenge
- France
- Germany
- Greece
- Israel
- Italy
- Philippines
  - Philippine Cup
- Russia
- Spain
- Turkey

=== Football (soccer) 2010 ===
National teams competitions

- UEFA Euro 2012 qualifying
- 2012 Africa Cup of Nations qualification

International clubs competitions

- UEFA (Europe) Champions League
- UEFA Europa League
- UEFA Women's Champions League
- Copa Sudamericana
- CAF Confederation Cup
- CONCACAF (North & Central America) Champions League
- OFC (Oceania) Champions League

Domestic (national) competitions

- Argentina
- Australia
- Brazil
- England
- France
- Germany
- Iran
- Italy
- Japan
- Russia
- Scotland
- Spain
- Major League Soccer (USA & Canada)
  - MLS Cup Playoffs

=== Golf 2010 ===
- LPGA Tour

=== Ice hockey 2010 ===
- National Hockey League
- Kontinental Hockey League
- Czech Extraliga
- Elitserien
- Canadian Hockey League:
  - OHL, QMJHL, WHL
- NCAA Division I men
- NCAA Division I women

=== Rugby union 2010 ===
- Heineken Cup
- European Challenge Cup
- English Premiership
- Celtic League
- LV Cup
- Top 14

=== Snooker ===
- Players Tour Championship

=== Winter sports ===
- Alpine Skiing World Cup
- Bobsleigh World Cup
- Cross-Country Skiing World Cup
- Grand Prix of Figure Skating
- Luge World Cup
- Nordic Combined World Cup
- Short Track Speed Skating World Cup
- Skeleton World Cup
- Ski Jumping World Cup
- Snowboard World Cup
- Speed Skating World Cup

== Days of the month ==
=== November 30, 2010 (Tuesday) ===
==== Football (soccer) ====
- Caribbean Championship Final Tournament in Martinique: (teams in **bold** advance to the semi-finals and qualify for 2011 CONCACAF Gold Cup)
  - Group H in Fort-de-France:
    - **Cuba** 0–0 **Grenada**
    - Martinique 0–1 Trinidad and Tobago
      - Final standings: Cuba 7 points, Grenada 5, Trinidad and Tobago 3, Martinique 1.

==== Other sports news ====
- The American magazine Sports Illustrated names New Orleans Saints quarterback Drew Brees its Sportsman of the Year.

=== November 29, 2010 (Monday) ===
==== American football ====
- NFL Monday Night Football Week 12: San Francisco 49ers 27, Arizona Cardinals 6

==== Cricket ====
- England in Australia:
  - Ashes series:
    - First Test in Brisbane, day 5: England 260 and 517/1d (152 overs; Alastair Cook 235*, Jonathan Trott 135*); Australia 481 and 107/1 (26 overs). **Match drawn; 5-match series level 0–0.**

==== Football (soccer) ====
- Caribbean Championship Final Tournament in Martinique: (team in **bold** advances to the semi-finals and qualifies for 2011 CONCACAF Gold Cup)
  - Group I in Riviére-Pilote:
    - Antigua and Barbuda 1–0 Guyana
    - Guadeloupe 0–2 **Jamaica**
      - Standings (after 2 matches): Jamaica 6 points, Antigua and Barbuda 3, Guyana, Guadeloupe 1.
- (Spain) La Liga, matchday 13:
  - El Clásico: Barcelona 5–0 Real Madrid
    - Barcelona win the match for the fifth straight time.
    - Standings: Barcelona 34 points, Real Madrid 32, Villarreal 27, RCD Espanyol 25
- 2011 FIFA Women's World Cup draw in Frankfurt, Germany:
  - Group A: Germany, Canada, Nigeria, France
  - Group B: Japan, New Zealand, Mexico, England
  - Group C: United States, North Korea, Colombia, Sweden
  - Group D: Brazil, Australia, Norway, Equatorial Guinea

==== U.S. college sports ====
- Conference realignment: TCU announces that it has accepted an invitation to join the Big East Conference effective in July 2012. TCU is the third school to leave the Mountain West Conference this year, after Utah and BYU.

=== November 28, 2010 (Sunday) ===
==== Alpine skiing ====
- Men's World Cup in Lake Louise, Canada:
  - Super-G: (gold) Tobias Grünenfelder (SUI) 1:32.31 (silver) Carlo Janka (SUI) 1:32.38 (bronze) Romed Baumann (AUT) 1:32.58
    - Overall standings (after 3 of 38 races): (1) Mario Scheiber (AUT) 130 points (2) Silvan Zurbriggen (SUI) 119 (3) Janka 116
- Women's World Cup in Aspen, United States:
  - Slalom: (gold) Maria Pietilä Holmner (SWE) 1:46.19 (silver) Maria Riesch (GER) 1:46.87 (bronze) Tanja Poutiainen (FIN) 1:47.12
    - Slalom standings (after 2 of 10 races): (1) Riesch 160 points (2) Pietilä Holmner 124 (3) Poutiainen 120
    - Overall standings (after 4 of 38 races): (1) Riesch 234 points (2) Poutiainen 196 (3) Viktoria Rebensburg (GER) 180

==== American football ====
- NFL Week 12:
  - Atlanta Falcons 20, Green Bay Packers 17
  - Pittsburgh Steelers 19, Buffalo Bills 16 (OT)
  - Cleveland Browns 24, Carolina Panthers 23
  - New York Giants 24, Jacksonville Jaguars 20
  - Minnesota Vikings 17, Washington Redskins 13
  - Houston Texans 20, Tennessee Titans 0
  - Kansas City Chiefs 42, Seattle Seahawks 24
  - Miami Dolphins 33, Oakland Raiders 17
  - St. Louis Rams 36, Denver Broncos 33
  - Chicago Bears 31, Philadelphia Eagles 26
  - Baltimore Ravens 17, Tampa Bay Buccaneers 10
  - Sunday Night Football: San Diego Chargers 36, Indianapolis Colts 14
- NCAA:
  - Auburn takes over the top spot in the BCS standings from Oregon with one week remaining in the regular season. TCU remains at #3, followed by Stanford, Wisconsin, Ohio State, Arkansas, Michigan State, Oklahoma and LSU. Boise State drops out of the top 10 following its first loss in 2 seasons. The Sooners' rise to #9 makes them the Big 12 South representative in the conference title game against Nebraska. The Badgers are likely to go to the Rose Bowl as the Big Ten's highest ranked team in next week's final BCS ranking.

==== Canadian football ====
- CFL Playoffs:
  - Grey Cup in Edmonton: **Montreal Alouettes** 21, Saskatchewan Roughriders 18
    - The Alouettes repeat their last year victory over the Roughriders, to win the Cup for the seventh time.

==== Cricket ====
- England in Australia:
  - Ashes series:
    - First Test in Brisbane, day 4: England 260 and 309/1 (101 overs; Alastair Cook 132*, Andrew Strauss 110); Australia 481. England lead by 88 runs with 9 wickets remaining.
- New Zealand in India:
  - 1st ODI in Guwahati: India 276 (49 overs; Virat Kohli 105); New Zealand 236 (45.2 overs). **India win by 40 runs; lead 5-match series 1–0.**

==== Cross-country skiing ====
- World Cup in Kuusamo, Finland:
  - Men's:
    - 15 km Freestyle Handicap Start: (gold) Lukáš Bauer (CZE) 38:10.5 (silver) Ilia Chernousov (RUS) 38:20.9 (bronze) Marcus Hellner (SWE) 38:26.6
      - Distance standings (after 3 of 17 races): (1) Hellner 165 points (2) Dario Cologna (SUI) 144 (3) Daniel Rickardsson (SWE) 127
    - Final Nordic Opening standings: (gold) Alexander Legkov (RUS) 1:05:17.1 (silver) Cologna 1:05:27.2 (bronze) Rickardsson 1:05:31.3
      - Overall standings (after 5 of 31 races): (1) Legkov 318 points (2) Cologna 311 (3) Hellner 265
  - Women's:
    - 10 km Freestyle Handicap Start: (gold) Therese Johaug (NOR) 29:24.2 (silver) Nicole Fessel (GER) 29:28.3 (bronze) Justyna Kowalczyk (POL) 29:34.9
      - Distance standings (after 3 of 17 races): (1) Marit Bjørgen (NOR) 190 points (2) Charlotte Kalla (SWE) 151 (3) Kowalczyk 125
    - Final Nordic Opening standings: (gold) Bjørgen 44:34.3 (silver) Kowalczyk 45:07.9 (bronze) Kalla 45:20.0
      - Overall standings (after 5 of 31 races): (1) Bjørgen 440 points (2) Kalla 311 (3) Kowalczyk 309

==== Equestrianism ====
- Show jumping:
  - FEI World Cup Central European League – South Sub-League:
    - 5th competition in Celje (CSI 2*-W): (gold) Juan Carlos Garcia (ITA) on Hilton Highlight (silver) Melissa Vanzani (ITA) on Kador du Valon (bronze) Francesca Arioldi (ITA) on Lady Chanu
- Dressage:
  - FEI World Cup Western European League:
    - 3rd competition in Stockholm (CDI-W): (gold) Adelinde Cornelissen (NED) on Parzival (silver) Anky van Grunsven (NED) on Painted Black (bronze) Edward Gal (NED) on Next One

==== Football (soccer) ====
- Caribbean Championship Final Tournament in Martinique: (team in **bold** advances to the semi-finals and qualifies for 2011 CONCACAF Gold Cup)
  - Group H in Fort-de-France:
    - Grenada 1–0 Trinidad and Tobago
    - Martinique 0–1 **Cuba**
      - Standings (after 2 matches): Cuba 6 points, Grenada 4, Martinique 1, Trinidad and Tobago 0.
- CAF Confederation Cup Final, first leg:
  - FUS Rabat (Morocco) 0–0 (Tunisia) CS Sfaxien

==== Golf ====
- European Tour:
  - Dubai World Championship in Dubai, United Arab Emirates:
    - Winner: Robert Karlsson (SWE) 274 (−14)^{PO}
      - Karlsson defeats Ian Poulter (ENG) on the second playoff hole to win his eleventh European Tour title.
    - Race to Dubai winner: Martin Kaymer (DEU)

==== Luge ====
- World Cup in Igls, Austria:
  - Men: (gold) Felix Loch (GER) 1:40.398 (silver) David Möller (GER) 1:40.444 (bronze) Armin Zöggeler (ITA) 1:40.560
  - Team: (gold) Germany 2:09.519 (silver) Canada 2:10.340 (bronze) Italy 2:10.431

==== Rugby union ====
- End of year tests:
  - Week 6:
    - Ireland 29–9 Argentina in Dublin

==== Ski jumping ====
- World Cup in Kuusamo, Finland:
  - HS 142: (gold) Andreas Kofler (AUT) 331.2 points (silver) Thomas Morgenstern (AUT) 328.3 (bronze) Simon Ammann (SUI) 310.1

==== Snooker ====
- Premier League:
  - Final in Hopton-on-Sea: **Ronnie O'Sullivan** (ENG) 7–1 Shaun Murphy (ENG)
    - O'Sullivan wins his record-extending ninth Premier League title and the 45th professional title of his career.

==== Speed skating ====
- World Cup 3 in Hamar, Norway:
  - 1500 m women: (gold) Christine Nesbitt (CAN) 1:58.00 (silver) Marrit Leenstra (NED) 1:58.03 (bronze) Brittany Schussler (CAN) 1:58.96
    - Standings (after 3 of 6 races): (1) Nesbitt 300 points (2) Leenstra 186 (3) Schussler 170
  - 10000 m men: (gold) Bob de Jong (NED) 13:05.83 (silver) Ivan Skobrev (RUS) 13:11.26 (bronze) Jorrit Bergsma (NED) 13:13.98
    - Standings (after 3 of 6 races): (1) de Jong 260 points (2) Skobrev 200 (3) Jonathan Kuck (USA) 185
  - Team Pursuit women: (gold) Canada 3:00.90 (silver) Russia 3:03.90 (bronze) Netherlands 3:04.62
    - Standings (after 2 of 3 races): (1) Netherlands 150 points (2) Germany 145 (3) Russia 130

==== Swimming ====
- European Short Course Championships in Eindhoven, Netherlands:
  - Men's:
    - 200m breaststroke: (gold) Marco Koch (GER) 2:04.86 (silver) Melquiades Álvarez Caraballo (ESP) 2:05.41 (bronze) Anton Lobanov (RUS) 2:06.71
    - 100m individual medley: (gold) Markus Deibler (GER) 52.13 (silver) Peter Mankoč (SLO) 52.87 (bronze) Alan Cabello Forns (ESP) 53.24
    - 200m freestyle: (gold) Danila Izotov (RUS) 1:41.84 (silver) Paul Biedermann (GER) 1:42.94 (bronze) Yevgeny Lagunov (RUS) 1:44.11
    - 100m backstroke: (gold) Stanislav Donets (RUS) 49.35 (silver) Damiano Lestingi (ITA) 51.46 (bronze) Artem Dubovskoy (RUS) 51.90
    - 50m butterfly: (gold) Steffen Deibler (GER) 22.34 (silver) Andriy Govorov (UKR) 22.74 (bronze) Joeri Verlinden (NED) 23.23
    - 4 × 50 m freestyle relay: (gold) Italy 1:25.16 (silver) Germany 1:25.19 (bronze) Russia 1:25.81
  - Women's:
    - 400m individual medley: (gold) Zsuzsanna Jakabos (HUN) 4:29.78 (silver) Anja Klinar (SLO) 4:30.83 (bronze) Lara Grangeon (FRA) 4:30.93
    - 200m freestyle: (gold) Femke Heemskerk (NED) 1:52.62 (silver) Silke Lippok (GER) 1:53.96 (bronze) Evelyn Verrasztó (HUN) 1:54.39
    - 100m butterfly: (gold) Inge Dekker (NED) 56.51 (silver) Ingvild Snildal (NOR) 57.46 (bronze) Caterina Giacchetti (ITA) 58.17
    - 100m breaststroke: (gold) Moniek Nijhuis (NED) 1:06.20 (silver) Sophie de Ronchi (FRA) 1:06.21 (bronze) Tessa Brouwer (NED) 1:06.65
    - 200m backstroke: (gold) Duane da Rocha Marce (ESP) 2:03.97 (silver) Sharon van Rouwendaal (NED) 2:04.13 (bronze) Daryna Zevina (UKR) 2:05.08
    - 50m freestyle: (gold) Ranomi Kromowidjojo (NED) 23.58 (silver) Hinkelien Schreuder (NED) 23.90 (bronze) Britta Steffen (GER) 23.95

==== Tennis ====
- ATP World Tour:
  - Barclays ATP World Tour Finals in London, United Kingdom, day 8:
    - Singles Final: **Roger Federer** (SUI) [2] def. Rafael Nadal (ESP) [1] 6–3, 3–6, 6–1
      - Federer wins his fifth year-end championship, his fifth title of the season, and the 66th title of his career.
    - Doubles Final: **Daniel Nestor** (CAN) / **Nenad Zimonjić** (SRB) [2] def. Mahesh Bhupathi (IND) / Max Mirnyi (BLR) [4] 7–6(6), 6–4
      - Nestor and Zimonjić win their second year-end championship as a pairing, with Nestor winning the tournament for the third time.
      - They also win their seventh title of the season, giving Zimonjić his 39th career title and Nestor his 71st.

=== November 27, 2010 (Saturday) ===
==== Alpine skiing ====
- Men's World Cup in Lake Louise, Canada:
  - Downhill: (gold) Michael Walchhofer (AUT) 1:47.78 (silver) Mario Scheiber (AUT) 1:48.33 (silver) Aksel Lund Svindal (NOR) 1:48.33
    - Overall standings (after 2 of 38 races): (1) Jean-Baptiste Grange (FRA) and Walchhofer 100 points (3) Silvan Zurbriggen (SUI) 90
- Women's World Cup in Aspen, United States:
  - Giant slalom: (gold) Tessa Worley (FRA) 2:06.81 (silver) Viktoria Rebensburg (GER) 2:06.82 (bronze) Kathrin Hölzl (GER) 2:06.83
    - Giant slalom standings (after 2 of 8 races): (1) Rebensburg 180 points (2) Hölzl 140 (3) Worley 132
    - Overall standings (after 3 of 38 races): (1) Rebensburg 180 points (2) Maria Riesch (GER) 154 (3) Hölzl 146

==== American football ====
- NCAA Division I FBS (unbeaten teams in **bold**):
  - BCS Top 10:
    - (3) **TCU** 66, New Mexico 17
      - The Horned Frogs finish the regular season with a perfect 12–0 record for the second successive year and all but secure a BCS berth.
    - Battle for the Golden Boot: (12) Arkansas 31, (5) LSU 23
    - (6) Stanford 38, Oregon State 0
    - (7) Wisconsin 70, Northwestern 23
    - Michigan–Ohio State rivalry: (8) Ohio State 37, Michigan 7
    - Bedlam Series: (13) Oklahoma 47, (9) Oklahoma State 41
      - The Sooners' win creates a three-way tie atop the Big 12 South involving the two Oklahoma teams and Texas A&M. The BCS standings, to be released on November 28, will determine the opponent for Nebraska in the Big 12 Championship Game.
    - Land Grant Trophy: (10) Michigan State 28, Penn State 22
      - The Spartans earn a share of the Big 10 title with Ohio State and Wisconsin for the first time in 20 years. The Big 10 representative in the Rose Bowl will be determined by the BCS ranking of December 5, with the Badgers currently in highest position.
  - Played earlier this week: (1) **Oregon**, (2) **Auburn**, (4) Boise State
  - Other games:
    - Border War: (14) Missouri 35, Kansas 7
    - Commonwealth Cup: (16) Virginia Tech 37, Virginia 7
    - Clemson–South Carolina rivalry: (18) South Carolina 29, Clemson 7
    - The Holy War: (20) Utah 17, Brigham Young 16
    - Florida–Florida State rivalry: (22) Florida State 31, Florida 7
    - Maryland 38, (23) North Carolina State 31
      - The Wolfpack's loss gives Florida State the ACC Atlantic title outright, and sends the Seminoles to Charlotte for the ACC Championship Game against Virginia Tech.
    - Floyd of Rosedale: Minnesota 27, (24) Iowa 24
    - Egg Bowl: (25) Mississippi State 31, Mississippi 23
    - Notre Dame–USC rivalry: Notre Dame 20, USC 16
      - The Fighting Irish claim the Jeweled Shillelagh for the first time since 2001.
    - Hawaiʻi 59, New Mexico State 24
      - The Warriors secure at least a share of the WAC championship.
    - FIU 31, Arkansas State 24
      - The Golden Panthers secure their first ever Sun Belt championship.
- NCAA Division I FCS:
  - NCAA Division I Football Championship First round:
    - Western Illinois 17, Coastal Carolina 10
    - Lehigh 14, Northern Iowa 7
    - Georgia Southern 41, South Carolina State 16
    - North Dakota State 43, Robert Morris 17
  - Bayou Classic in New Orleans: Grambling 38, Southern 17

==== Bobsleigh ====
- World Cup in Whistler, Canada:
  - Four-man: (gold) Steve Holcomb/Justin Olsen/Steven Langton/Curtis Tomasevicz (USA) 1:42.84 (silver) Maximilian Arndt/Rene Tiefert/Martin Putze/Alexander Rödiger (GER) 1:43.01 (bronze) Manuel Machata/Andreas Bredau/Michail Makarow/Christian Poser (GER) 1:43.05

==== Canadian football ====
- CIS football:
  - Vanier Cup in Quebec City: **Laval Rouge et Or** 29, Calgary Dinos 2
    - Laval win the Cup for the sixth time.

==== Cricket ====
- West Indies in Sri Lanka:
  - 2nd Test in Colombo, day 5: Sri Lanka 387/9d and 57/1d (15 overs); West Indies 243 (71.3 overs) and 12/2 (11 overs). **Match drawn; 3-match series level 0–0.**
- England in Australia:
  - Ashes series:
    - First Test in Brisbane, day 3: England 260 and 19/0 (15 overs); Australia 481 (158.4 overs; Michael Hussey 195, Brad Haddin 136, Steven Finn 6/125). England trail by 202 runs with 10 wickets remaining.

==== Cross-country skiing ====
- World Cup in Kuusamo, Finland:
  - Men's 10 km Classic: (gold) Dario Cologna (SUI) 23:24.8 (silver) Alexander Legkov (RUS) 23:31.5 (bronze) Daniel Rickardsson (SWE) 23:32.3
    - Distance standings (after 2 of 17 races): (1) Cologna 130 points (2) Marcus Hellner (SWE) 122 (3) Rickardsson 103
    - Overall standings (after 3 of 31 races): (1) Cologna 137 points (2) Hellner 122 (3) Rickardsson 103
  - Women's 5 km Classic: (gold) Marit Bjørgen (NOR) 12:51.9 (silver) Justyna Kowalczyk (POL) 12:54.0 (bronze) Petra Majdič (SLO) 13:08.7
    - Distance standings (after 2 of 17 races): (1) Bjørgen 150 points (2) Charlotte Kalla (SWE) 114 (3) Kowalczyk 82
    - Overall standings (after 3 of 31 races): (1) Bjørgen 200 points (2) Kalla 154 (3) Majdič 111

==== Figure skating ====
- ISU Grand Prix:
  - Trophée Eric Bompard in Paris, France: (skaters in **bold** qualify for the Final)
    - Pairs: (gold) **Aliona Savchenko / Robin Szolkowy** (GER) 197.88 (silver) **Vera Bazarova / Yuri Larionov** (RUS) 183.00 (bronze) Maylin Hausch / Daniel Wende (GER) 157.42
      - Final standings: Savchenko / Szolkowy, **Pang Qing / Tong Jian** (CHN) 30 points, Bazarova / Larionov, **Kirsten Moore-Towers / Dylan Moscovitch** (CAN) 26, **Lubov Iliushechkina / Nodari Maisuradze** (RUS), **Sui Wenjing / Han Cong** (CHN), Narumi Takahashi / Mervin Tran (JPN) 24.
    - Men: (gold) **Takahiko Kozuka** (JPN) 248.07 (silver) **Florent Amodio** (FRA) 229.38 (bronze) Brandon Mroz (USA) 214.31
      - Final standings: Kozuka, **Daisuke Takahashi** (JPN) 30 points, **Patrick Chan** (CAN) 28, **Tomáš Verner** (CZE), **Nobunari Oda** (JPN) 26, Amodio, Jeremy Abbott (USA), Mroz 24.
    - Ladies: (gold) Kiira Korpi (FIN) 169.74 (silver) Mirai Nagasu (USA) 167.79 (bronze) **Alissa Czisny** (USA) 159.80
      - Final standings: **Miki Ando** (JPN) 30 points, Czisny, **Carolina Kostner** (ITA), **Kanako Murakami** (JPN), **Akiko Suzuki** (JPN), **Rachael Flatt** (USA) 26.
    - Ice Dance: (gold) **Nathalie Péchalat / Fabian Bourzat** (FRA) 161.82 (silver) Ekaterina Riazanova / Ilia Tkachenko 146.79 (bronze) Madison Chock / Greg Zuerlein (USA) 138.48
      - Final standings: **Meryl Davis / Charlie White** (USA), Péchalat / Bourzat 30 points, **Vanessa Crone / Paul Poirier** (CAN), **Ekaterina Bobrova / Dmitri Soloviev** (RUS) 28, **Kaitlyn Weaver / Andrew Poje** (CAN), **Nóra Hoffmann / Maxim Zavozin** (HUN), Maia Shibutani / Alex Shibutani (USA), Chock / Zuerlein 22.

==== Football (soccer) ====
- 2011 FIFA Women's World Cup qualification:
  - UEFA-CONCACAF play-off, second leg in Bridgeview, Illinois: (first leg score in parentheses)
    - **United States** 1–0 (1–0) Italy. United States win 2–0 on aggregate and qualify for the World Cup.
- Caribbean Championship Final Tournament in Martinique:
  - Group I in Riviére-Pilote:
    - Guyana 1–1 Guadeloupe
    - Jamaica 3–1 Antigua and Barbuda

==== Luge ====
- World Cup in Igls, Austria:
  - Women: (gold) Tatjana Hüfner (GER) 1:19.594 (silver) Natalie Geisenberger (GER) 1:19.802 (bronze) Erin Hamlin (USA) 1:19.974
  - Doubles: (gold) Andreas Linger/Wolfgang Linger (AUT) 1:18.946 (silver) Christian Oberstolz/Patrick Gruber (ITA) 1:19.127 (bronze) Peter Penz/Georg Fischler (AUT) 1:19.142

==== Nordic combined ====
- World Cup in Kuusamo, Finland:
  - HS 142 / 10 km: (gold) Felix Gottwald (AUT) 28:17.5 (silver) Mikko Kokslien (NOR) 28:25.0 (bronze) Jason Lamy-Chappuis (FRA) 28:27.0
    - Overall standings (after 2 of 12 races): (1) Lamy-Chappuis 160 points (2) Gottwald 150 (3) Eric Frenzel (GER) 125

==== Rugby union ====
- 2011 Rugby World Cup qualifying:
  - Final Place Play-off Qualification Final, second leg in Bucharest (first leg score in parentheses):
    - **Romania** 39–12 (21–21) Uruguay. Romania win 60–33 on aggregate and qualify for the World Cup.
- End of year tests:
  - Week 6:
    - Georgia 19–17 United States in Tbilisi
    - Italy 24–16 Fiji in Modena
    - England 11–21 South Africa in London
    - Scotland 19–16 Samoa in Aberdeen
    - Spain 33–20 Namibia in Palma de Mallorca
    - Portugal 20–23 Canada in Lisbon
    - Wales 25–37 New Zealand in Cardiff
      - New Zealand's Dan Carter scores 12 points and becomes the highest point scorer in Test rugby with 1188 points, 10 ahead of Jonny Wilkinson (ENG).
      - The All Blacks also complete their fourth successful Grand Slam tour and their third since 2005.
    - France 16–59 Australia in Saint-Denis

==== Ski jumping ====
- World Cup in Kuusamo, Finland:
  - HS 142 team: (gold) Austria 1231.4 points (silver) Norway 1163.4 (bronze) Japan 1121.3

==== Snooker ====
- Premier League:
  - Semi-finals in Hopton-on-Sea:
    - Marco Fu (HKG) 2–5 **Shaun Murphy** (ENG)
    - **Ronnie O'Sullivan** (ENG) 5–1 Neil Robertson (AUS)

==== Speed skating ====
- World Cup 3 in Hamar, Norway:
  - 1500 m men: (gold) Trevor Marsicano (USA) 1:45.54 (silver) Simon Kuipers (NED) 1:45.97 (bronze) Shani Davis (USA) 1:45.98
    - Standings (after 3 of 6 races): (1) Davis 210 points (2) Kuipers 205 (3) Marsicano 201
  - 5000 m women: (gold) Stephanie Beckert (GER) 6:59.18 (silver) Martina Sáblíková (CZE) 7:03.95 (bronze) Eriko Ishino (JPN) 7:06.70
    - Standings (after 3 of 6 races): (1) Beckert 270 points (2) Jilleanne Rookard (USA) 200 (3) Sáblíková 160
  - Team Pursuit men: (gold) United States 3:43.58 (silver) Canada 3:44.61 (bronze) Norway 3:47.01
    - Standings (after 2 of 3 races): (1) United States 200 points (2) Norway 150 (3) Canada 130

==== Swimming ====
- European Short Course Championships in Eindhoven, Netherlands:
  - Men's:
    - 1500m freestyle: (gold) Federico Colbertaldo (ITA) 14:35.36 (silver) Sergiy Frolov (UKR) 14:42.01 (bronze) Job Kienhuis (NED) 14:42.39
    - 200m butterfly: (gold) Dinko Jukić (AUT) 1:53.35 (silver) Tim Wallburger (GER) 1:53.71 (bronze) Bence Biczó (HUN) 1:53.75
    - 100m freestyle: (gold) Danila Izotov (RUS) 46.56 (silver) Yevgeny Lagunov (RUS) 46.60 (bronze) Luca Dotto (ITA) 47.09
    - 50m breaststroke: (gold) Robin van Aggele (NED) 26.44 (silver) Aleksander Hetland (NOR) 26.56 (bronze) Fabio Scozzoli (ITA) 26.68 (bronze) Hendrik Feldwehr (GER) 26.68
  - Women's:
    - 400m freestyle: (gold) Ágnes Mutina (HUN) 4:01.25 (silver) Melanie Costa Schmid (ESP) 4:02.26 (bronze) Gráinne Murphy (IRL) 4:02.86
    - 100m individual medley: (gold) Evelyn Verrasztó (HUN) 59.53 (silver) Hinkelien Schreuder (NED) 59.57 (bronze) Theresa Michalak (GER) 59.85
    - 50m backstroke: (gold) Sanja Jovanović (CRO) 27.10 (silver) Elena Gemo (ITA) 27.13 (bronze) Simona Baumrtová (CZE) 27.30
    - 4 × 50 m medley relay: (gold) Netherlands 1:44.98 (silver) Germany 1:47.70 (bronze) Italy 1:49.56

==== Tennis ====
- ATP World Tour:
  - Barclays ATP World Tour Finals in London, United Kingdom, day 7:
    - Singles Semifinals:
      - **Rafael Nadal** (ESP) [1] def. Andy Murray (GBR) [5] 7–6(5), 3–6, 7–6(6)
      - **Roger Federer** (SUI) [2] def. Novak Djokovic (SRB) [3] 6–1, 6–4
    - Doubles Semifinals:
      - **Daniel Nestor** (CAN) / **Nenad Zimonjić** (SRB) [2] def. Bob Bryan (USA) / Mike Bryan (USA) [1] 6–3, 3–6, [12–10]
      - **Mahesh Bhupathi** (IND) / **Max Mirnyi** (BLR) [4] def. Mariusz Fyrstenberg (POL) / Marcin Matkowski (POL) [6] 6–4, 6–4

==== Volleyball ====
- Asian Games in Guangzhou, China:
  - Women:
    - Bronze medal game: (bronze) **Kazakhstan** 3–0 North Korea
    - Final: (silver) South Korea 2–3 (gold) **China**

=== November 26, 2010 (Friday) ===
==== American football ====
- NCAA (unbeaten teams in **bold**):
  - BCS Top 10:
    - (1) **Oregon** 49, (21) Arizona 28
      - The Ducks clinch at least a share of the Pac-10 title, and also earn the automatic Pac-10 BCS berth.
    - Iron Bowl: (2) **Auburn** 28, (11) Alabama 27
      - The Tigers finish the regular season with a perfect 12–0 record.
    - (19) Nevada 34, (4) Boise State 31 (OT)
      - The Wolf Pack stop the Broncos' winning streak at 24 games, since the 2008 Poinsettia Bowl, and 37 regular season games.
  - Other games:
    - (15) Nebraska 45, Colorado 17
      - The Cornhuskers win the Big 12 North and punch their ticket to the Big 12 Championship Game.
    - Backyard Brawl: West Virginia 35, Pittsburgh 10
    - Kent State 28, Ohio 6
      - The Bobcats' loss gives Miami (OH) the MAC East title and a trip to Detroit to take on Northern Illinois in the MAC Championship Game.
    - SMU 45, East Carolina 38 (OT)
    - Tulsa 56, Southern Miss 50
      - With these results, the participants in the Conference USA Championship Game are set, with SMU playing UCF in Orlando.

==== Basketball ====
- Asian Games in Guangzhou, China:
  - Men:
    - Bronze medal game: Japan 66–74 (bronze) **Iran**
    - Gold medal game: (silver) South Korea 71–77 (gold) **China**

==== Bobsleigh ====
- World Cup in Whistler, Canada:
  - Women: (gold) Sandra Kiriasis/Stephanie Schneider (GER) 1:47.70 (silver) Shauna Rohbock/Valerie Fleming (USA) 1:47.99 (bronze) Kaillie Humphries/Heather Hughes (CAN) 1:48.17

==== Cricket ====
- West Indies in Sri Lanka:
  - 2nd Test in Colombo, day 4: Sri Lanka 387/9d; West Indies 165/5 (45 overs). West Indies trail by 222 runs with 5 wickets remaining in the 1st innings.
- England in Australia:
  - Ashes series:
    - First Test in Brisbane, day 2: England 260; Australia 220/5 (80 overs). Australia trail by 40 runs with 5 wickets remaining in the 1st innings.
- Asian Games in Guangzhou, China:
  - Men:
    - Bronze medal match: Sri Lanka 135 (19.5 overs); (bronze) Pakistan 141/4 (18 overs). **Pakistan win by 6 wickets.**
    - Final: (silver) Afghanistan 118/8 (20 overs); (gold) Bangladesh 119/5 (19.3 overs). **Bangladesh win by 5 wickets.**

==== Cross-country skiing ====
- World Cup in Kuusamo, Finland:
  - Men's Sprint Classic: (gold) John Kristian Dahl (NOR) (silver) Alexey Poltaranin (KAZ) (bronze) Sami Jauhojärvi (FIN)
    - Overall standings (after 2 of 31 races): (1) Marcus Hellner (SWE) 100 points (2) Dario Cologna (SUI) 87 (3) Daniel Rickardsson (SWE) 60
  - Women's Sprint Classic: (gold) Marit Bjørgen (NOR) (silver) Petra Majdič (SLO) (bronze) Astrid Uhrenholdt Jacobsen (NOR)
    - Overall standings (after 2 of 31 races): (1) Bjørgen 150 points (2) Charlotte Kalla (SWE) 120 (3) Arianna Follis (ITA) 90

==== Figure skating ====
- ISU Grand Prix:
  - Trophée Eric Bompard in Paris, France:
    - Pairs Short Program: (1) Aliona Savchenko / Robin Szolkowy (GER) 66.65 (2) Vera Bazarova / Yuri Larionov (RUS) 64.18 (3) Maylin Hausch / Daniel Wende (GER) 54.02
    - Men Short Program: (1) Takahiko Kozuka (JPN) 77.64 (2) Florent Amodio (FRA) 75.62 (3) Brandon Mroz (USA) 72.46
    - Ladies Short Program: (1) Kiira Korpi (FIN) 61.39 (2) Mirai Nagasu (USA) 58.72 (3) Haruka Imai (JPN) 58.38
    - Ice Dance Short Dance: (1) Nathalie Péchalat / Fabian Bourzat (FRA) 65.48 (2) Ekaterina Riazanova / Ilia Tkachenko (RUS) 60.81 (3) Madison Chock / Greg Zuerlein (USA) 58.09

==== Football (soccer) ====
- Caribbean Championship Final Tournament in Martinique:
  - Group H in Fort-de-France:
    - Trinidad and Tobago 0–2 Cuba
    - Martinique 1–1 Grenada

==== Handball ====
- Asian Games in Guangzhou, China:
  - Men:
    - Bronze medal game: (bronze) **Japan** 27–20 Saudi Arabia
    - Gold medal game: (silver) Iran 28–32 (gold) **South Korea**
  - Women:
    - Bronze medal game: (bronze) **South Korea** 38–26 Kazakhstan
    - Gold medal game: (silver) Japan 22–31 (gold) **China**

==== Nordic combined ====
- World Cup in Kuusamo, Finland:
  - HS 142 / 10 km: (gold) Jason Lamy-Chappuis (FRA) 28:33.5 (silver) Eric Frenzel (GER) 28:40.1 (bronze) Mario Stecher (AUT) 28:45.2

==== Rugby union ====
- End of year tests:
  - Week 6:
    - French Barbarians 27–28 Tonga in Grenoble

==== Skeleton ====
- World Cup in Whistler, Canada:
  - Men: (gold) Jon Montgomery (CAN) 1:47.56 (silver) Kristan Bromley (GBR) 1:47.84 (bronze) Aleksandr Tretyakov (RUS) 1:47.88

==== Softball ====
- Asian Games in Guangzhou, China:
  - Women:
    - Final: (bronze) Chinese Taipei 1–2 **China**
    - Grand Final: (gold) **Japan** 2–0 (silver) China

==== Swimming ====
- European Short Course Championships in Eindhoven, Netherlands:
  - Men's:
    - 400m individual medley: (gold) Dávid Verrasztó (HUN) 4:03.06 (silver) Yannick Lebherz (GER) 4:05.08 (bronze) Federico Turrini (ITA) 4:05.24
    - 100m breaststroke: (gold) Fabio Scozzoli (ITA) 57.78 (silver) Hendrik Feldwehr (GER) 58.09 (bronze) Robin van Aggele (NED) 58.68
    - 100m butterfly: (gold) Steffen Deibler (GER) 49.95 (silver) Joeri Verlinden (NED) 50.52 (bronze) Peter Mankoč (SLO) 50.92
    - 50m backstroke: (gold) Stanislav Donets (RUS) 22.74 (ER) (silver) Vitaly Borisov (RUS) 23.72 (bronze) Nick Driebergen (NED) 23.73
  - Women's:
    - 800m freestyle: (gold) Federica Pellegrini (ITA) 8:15.20 (silver) Boglárka Kapás (HUN) 8:18.56 (bronze) Gráinne Murphy (IRL) 8:19.45
    - 200m breaststroke: (gold) Anastasia Chaun (RUS) 2:22.68 (silver) Tanja Smid (SLO) 2:22.88 (bronze) Chiara Boggiatto (ITA) 2:24.52
    - 100m freestyle: (gold) Ranomi Kromowidjojo (NED) 51.44 (silver) Femke Heemskerk (NED) 52.02 (bronze) Britta Steffen (GER) 52.92
    - 100m backstroke: (gold) Daryna Zevina (UKR) 57.57 (silver) Sharon van Rouwendaal (NED) 57.91 (bronze) Duane da Rocha Marce (ESP) 58.37
    - 50m butterfly: (gold) Inge Dekker (NED) 25.38 (silver) Hinkelien Schreuder (NED) 25.49 (bronze) Triin Aljand (EST) 25.90
    - 4 × 50 m freestyle relay: (gold) Netherlands 1:34.34 (silver) Germany 1:36.83 (bronze) Finland 1:39.02

==== Tennis ====
- ATP World Tour:
  - Barclays ATP World Tour Finals in London, United Kingdom, day 6: (players in **bold** advance to the semifinals)
    - Singles – Group A:
      - **Rafael Nadal** (ESP) [1] def. Tomáš Berdych (CZE) [6] 7–6(3), 6–1
      - **Novak Djokovic** (SRB) [3] def. Andy Roddick (USA) [8] 6–2, 6–3
        - Final standings: Nadal 3–0, Djokovic 2–1, Berdych 1–2, Roddick 0–3.
    - Doubles – Group B:
      - Łukasz Kubot (POL) / Oliver Marach (AUT) [5] def. **Daniel Nestor** (CAN) / **Nenad Zimonjić** (SRB) [2] 6–0, 1–6, [10–6]
      - **Mahesh Bhupathi** (IND) / **Max Mirnyi** (BLR) [4] def. Wesley Moodie (RSA) / Dick Norman (BEL) [8] 6–4, 6–4
        - Final standings: Nestor/Zimonjić, Bhupathi/Mirnyi 2–1, Moodie/Norman, Kubot/Marach 1–2.

==== Volleyball ====
- Asian Games in Guangzhou, China:
  - Men:
    - Bronze medal game: (bronze) **South Korea** 3–0 Thailand
    - Final: (gold) **Japan** 3–1 (silver) Iran

=== November 25, 2010 (Thursday) ===
==== American football ====
- NFL Week 12: Thanksgiving Day games
  - New England Patriots 45, Detroit Lions 24
  - New Orleans Saints 30, Dallas Cowboys 27
  - New York Jets 26, Cincinnati Bengals 10
- NCAA Division I FBS BCS Top 25:
  - State Farm Lone Star Showdown: (17) Texas A&M 24, Texas 17

==== Basketball ====
- Asian Games in Guangzhou, China:
  - Women:
    - Bronze medal game: (bronze) **Japan** 73–61 Chinese Taipei
    - Gold medal game: (silver) South Korea 64–70 (gold) **China**
- Euroleague:
  - Regular Season, matchday 6:
    - Group A:
      - Partizan Belgrade (Serbia) 68–62 (Lithuania) Žalgiris Kaunas
      - Maccabi Tel Aviv (Israel) 81–70 (Spain) Caja Laboral
        - Standings (after 6 games): Maccabi Tel Aviv 5–1, Žalgiris, Partizan 4–2, Caja Laboral, (Russia) Khimki Moscow 2–4, (Poland) Asseco Prokom Gdynia 1–5.
    - Group B:
      - Spirou Basket (Belgium) 79–74 (Spain) Unicaja Málaga
      - Brose Baskets (Germany) 67–68 (Italy) Virtus Roma
      - Real Madrid (Spain) 82–68 (Greece) Olympiacos Piraeus
        - Standings (after 6 games): Olympiacos, Real Madrid 4–2, Unicaja, Virtus Roma 3–3, Brose Baskets, Spirou Charleroi 2–4.
    - Group C: KK Cibona Zagreb (Croatia) 75–94 (Spain) Regal FC Barcelona
      - Standings (after 6 games): (Italy) Montepaschi Siena, (Turkey) Fenerbahçe Ülker 5–1, Regal FC Barcelona 4–2, (France) Cholet Basket 3–3, (Lithuania) Lietuvos Rytas 1–5, Cibona Zagreb 0–6.
    - Group D:
      - Panathinaikos Athens (Greece) 69–73 (Spain) Power Electronics Valencia
      - Efes Pilsen Istanbul (Turkey) 84–78 (Slovenia) Union Olimpija Ljubljana
        - Standings (after 6 games): Panathinaikos, Efes Pilsen, Union Olimpija 4–2, (Italy) Armani Jeans Milano 3–3, Power Electronics 2–4, (Russia) CSKA Moscow 1–5.

==== Bobsleigh ====
- World Cup in Whistler, Canada:
  - Two-man: (gold) Manuel Manchata/Andreas Bredau (GER) 1:44.06 (silver) Lyndon Rush/Neville Wright (CAN) 1:44.25 (silver) Karl Angerer/Christian Friedrich (GER) 1:44.25

==== Cricket ====
- West Indies in Sri Lanka:
  - 2nd Test in Colombo, day 3: Sri Lanka 387/9d (115.2 overs; Kumar Sangakkara 150, Kemar Roach 5/100); West Indies 165/5 (45 overs). West Indies trail by 222 runs with 5 wickets remaining in the 1st innings.
- England in Australia:
  - Ashes series:
    - First Test in Brisbane, day 1: England 260 (76.5 overs; Peter Siddle 6/54); Australia 25/0 (7 overs). Australia trail by 235 runs with 10 wickets remaining in the 1st innings.
      - On his birthday, Siddle bowls the 38th hat-trick in Test cricket, and the first by an Australian since Glenn McGrath in 2000–01. Siddle's hat-trick was the first in an Ashes test since Darren Gough in 1998–99 and the first by an Australian in an Ashes test since Shane Warne in 1994–95.

==== Field hockey ====
- Asian Games in Guangzhou, China:
  - Men:
    - Bronze medal match: South Korea 0–1 (bronze) **India**
    - Gold medal match: (gold) **Pakistan** 2–0 (silver) Malaysia

==== Football (soccer) ====
- Asian Games in Guangzhou, China:
  - Men:
    - Bronze medal match: Iran 3–4 (bronze) **South Korea**
    - Gold medal match: (gold) **Japan** 1–0 (silver) United Arab Emirates
- Copa Sudamericana Semifinals, second leg: (first leg score in parentheses)
  - **Independiente** (Argentina) 2–1 (2–3) (Ecuador) LDU Quito. 3–3 on points, 4–4 on aggregate; Independiente win on away goals.

==== Skeleton ====
- World Cup in Whistler, Canada:
  - Women: (gold) Marion Thees (GER) 1:48.98 (silver) Mellisa Hollingsworth (CAN) 1:49.40 (bronze) Anja Huber (GER) 1:50.07

==== Swimming ====
- European Short Course Championships in Eindhoven, Netherlands:
  - Men's:
    - 400m freestyle: (gold) Paul Biedermann (GER) 3:39.51 (silver) Federico Colbertaldo (ITA) 3:41.70 (bronze) Alexander Selin (RUS) 3:43.70
    - 200m backstroke: (gold) Yannick Lebherz (GER) 1:51.74 (silver) Damiano Lestingi (ITA) 1:51.84 (bronze) Artem Dubovskoy (RUS) 1:52.72
    - 200m individual medley: (gold) Markus Deibler (GER) 1:53.25 (silver) Vytautas Janušaitis (LTU) 1:54.07 (bronze) Dinko Jukić (AUT) 1:54.93
    - 50m freestyle: (gold) Steffen Deibler (GER) 20.98 (silver) Marco Orsi (ITA) 21.17 (bronze) Andriy Govorov (UKR) 21.32
    - 4 × 50 m medley relay: (gold) Germany 1:33.40 (silver) Italy 1:33.83 (bronze) Russia 1:34.25
  - Women's:
    - 200m individual medley: (gold) Evelyn Verrasztó (HUN) 2:07.06 (silver) Kimberly Buys (BEL) 2:10.14 (bronze) Lara Grangeon (FRA) 2:10.22
    - 200m butterfly: (gold) Zsuzsanna Jakabos (HUN) 2:05.58 (silver) Alessia Polieri (ITA) 2:06.18 (bronze) Caterina Giacchetti (ITA) 2:06.49
    - 50m breaststroke: (gold) Dorothea Brandt (GER) 30.40 (silver) Moniek Nijhuis (NED) 30.45 (bronze) Valentina Artemyeva (RUS) 30.55

==== Tennis ====
- ATP World Tour:
  - Barclays ATP World Tour Finals in London, United Kingdom, day 5: (players in **bold** advance to the semifinals)
    - Singles – Group B:
      - **Roger Federer** (SUI) [2] def. Robin Söderling (SWE) [4] 7–6(5), 6–3
      - **Andy Murray** (GBR) [5] def. David Ferrer (ESP) [7] 6–2, 6–2
        - Final standings: Federer 3–0, Murray 2–1, Söderling 1–2, Ferrer 0–3.
    - Doubles – Group A:
      - **Bob Bryan** (USA) / **Mike Bryan** (USA) [1] def. Lukáš Dlouhý (CZE) / Leander Paes (IND) [3] 6–3, 6–4
      - **Mariusz Fyrstenberg** (POL) / **Marcin Matkowski** (POL) [6] def. Jürgen Melzer (AUT) / Philipp Petzschner (GER) [7] 6–3, 7–6(7)
        - Final standings: Fyrstenberg/Matkowski 3–0, Bryan/Bryan 2–1, Melzer/Petzschner 1–2, Dlouhý/Paes 0–3.

==== Water polo ====
- Asian Games in Guangzhou, China:
  - Men:
    - 3rd place match: South Korea 5–19 (bronze) **Japan**
    - Final: (silver) China 6–7 (gold) **Kazakhstan**

=== November 24, 2010 (Wednesday) ===
==== Basketball ====
- Euroleague:
  - Regular Season, matchday 6:
    - Group A: Asseco Prokom Gdynia (Poland) 71–67 (Russia) Khimki Moscow
    - Group C:
      - Lietuvos Rytas (Lithuania) 75–81 (Turkey) Fenerbahçe Ülker
      - Cholet Basket (France) 61–70 (Italy) Montepaschi Siena
    - Group D: Armani Jeans Milano (Italy) 71–65 (Russia) CSKA Moscow

==== Cricket ====
- Pakistan vs South Africa in UAE:
  - 2nd Test in Abu Dhabi, day 5: South Africa 584/9d and 203/5d (55 overs); Pakistan 434 and 153/3 (67 overs). **Match drawn; 2-match series drawn 0–0.**
- West Indies in Sri Lanka:
  - 2nd Test in Colombo, day 2: Sri Lanka 294/5 (90 overs; Kumar Sangakkara 135*); West Indies.

==== Field hockey ====
- Asian Games in Guangzhou, China:
  - Women:
    - Bronze medal match: (bronze) **Japan** 1–0 (a.e.t.) India
    - Final: (gold) **China** 0–0 (5–4 pen.) (silver) South Korea

==== Football (soccer) ====
- UEFA Champions League group stage, matchday 5: (teams in **bold** advance to the Round of 16, teams in italics advance to the Europa League Round of 32)
  - Group A:
    - **Internazionale** (Italy) 1–0 (Netherlands) Twente
    - **Tottenham Hotspur** (England) 3–0 (Germany) Werder Bremen
      - Standings (after 5 matches): Tottenham Hotspur, Internazionale 10 points, Twente 5, Werder Bremen 2.
  - Group B:
    - **Schalke 04** (Germany) 3–0 (France) **Lyon**
    - Hapoel Tel Aviv (Israel) 3–0 (Portugal) Benfica
      - Hapoel Tel Aviv score the first win of an Israeli club in the Champions League group stage since Maccabi Tel Aviv beat Ajax in 2004–05.
      - Standings (after 5 matches): Schalke 04 10 points, Lyon 9, Benfica 6, Hapoel Tel Aviv 4.
  - Group C:
    - Rangers (Scotland) 0–1 (England) **Manchester United**
    - **Valencia** (Spain) 6–1 (Turkey) Bursaspor
      - Standings (after 5 matches): Manchester United 13 points, Valencia 10, Rangers 5, Bursaspor 0.
  - Group D:
    - Rubin Kazan (Russia) 1–0 (Denmark) Copenhagen
    - Panathinaikos (Greece) 0–3 (Spain) **Barcelona**
      - Standings (after 5 matches): Barcelona 11 points, Copenhagen 7, Rubin Kazan 6, Panathinaikos 2.
- Copa Sudamericana Semifinals, second leg: (first leg score in parentheses)
  - Palmeiras (Brazil) 1–2 (1–0) (Brazil) **Goiás**. 3–3 on points, 2–2 on aggregate; Goiás win on away goals rule.

==== Tennis ====
- ATP World Tour:
  - Barclays ATP World Tour Finals in London, United Kingdom, day 4: (players in **bold** advance to the semifinals)
    - Singles – Group A:
      - Tomáš Berdych (CZE) [6] def. Andy Roddick (USA) [8] 7–5, 6–3
      - Rafael Nadal (ESP) [1] def. Novak Djokovic (SRB) [3] 7–5, 6–2
        - Standings: Nadal 2–0, Djokovic, Berdych 1–1, Roddick 0–2.
    - Doubles – Group B:
      - Wesley Moodie (RSA) / Dick Norman (BEL) [8] def. Łukasz Kubot (POL) / Oliver Marach (AUT) [5] 6–1, 6–3
      - **Daniel Nestor** (CAN) / **Nenad Zimonjić** (SRB) [2] def. Mahesh Bhupathi (IND) / Max Mirnyi (BLR) [4] 7–6(5), 7–6(1)
        - Standings: Nestor/Zimonjić 2–0, Bhupathi/Mirnyi, Moodie/Norman 1–1, Kubot/Marach 0–2.

=== November 23, 2010 (Tuesday) ===
==== Baseball ====
- Major League Baseball awards:
  - American League Most Valuable Player: Josh Hamilton, Texas Rangers
    - Hamilton becomes the first Ranger to win the Award since Alex Rodriguez in 2003.

==== Cricket ====
- Pakistan vs South Africa in UAE:
  - 2nd Test in Abu Dhabi, day 4: South Africa 584/9d and 173/4 (49 overs); Pakistan 434 (144.1 overs). South Africa lead by 323 runs with 6 wickets remaining.
- New Zealand in India:
  - 3rd Test in Nagpur, day 4: New Zealand 193 and 175 (51.2 overs); India 566/8d. **India win by an innings and 198 runs; win 3-match series 1–0.**
- West Indies in Sri Lanka:
  - 2nd Test in Colombo, day 1: Sri Lanka 84/3 (37.2 overs); West Indies.

==== Football (soccer) ====
- UEFA Champions League group stage, matchday 5: (teams in **bold** advance to the Round of 16, teams in italics advance to the Europa League Round of 32)
  - Group E:
    - Roma (Italy) 3–2 (Germany) **Bayern Munich**
    - Basel (Switzerland) 1–0 (Romania) CFR Cluj
      - Standings (after 5 matches): Bayern Munich 12 points, Roma 9, Basel 6, CFR Cluj 3.
  - Group F:
    - Spartak Moscow (Russia) 0–3 (France) **Marseille**
    - **Chelsea** (England) 2–1 (Slovakia) Žilina
      - Standings (after 5 matches): Chelsea 15 points, Marseille 9, Spartak Moscow 6, Žilina 0.
  - Group G:
    - Ajax (Netherlands) 0–4 (Spain) **Real Madrid**
    - Auxerre (France) 0–2 (Italy) **Milan**
      - Standings (after 5 matches): Real Madrid 13 points, Milan 8, Ajax 4, Auxerre 3.
  - Group H:
    - Braga (Portugal) 2–0 (England) Arsenal
    - Partizan (Serbia) 0–3 (Ukraine) Shakhtar Donetsk
      - Standings (after 5 matches): Shakhtar Donetsk 12 points, Arsenal, Braga 9, Partizan 0.

==== Rugby union ====
- Asian Games in Guangzhou, China:
  - Men:
    - Bronze medal match: (bronze) **South Korea** 21–14 China
    - Final: (gold) **Japan** 28–21 (silver) Hong Kong
  - Women:
    - Bronze medal match: Hong Kong 12–17 (bronze) **Thailand**
    - Final: (silver) China 14–17 (gold) **Kazakhstan**

==== Tennis ====
- ATP World Tour:
  - Barclays ATP World Tour Finals in London, United Kingdom, day 3:
    - Singles – Group B:
      - Roger Federer (SUI) [2] def. Andy Murray (GBR) [5] 6–4, 6–2
      - Robin Söderling (SWE) [4] def. David Ferrer (ESP) [7] 7–5, 7–5
        - Standings: Federer 2–0, Murray, Söderling 1–1, Ferrer 0–2.
    - Doubles – Group A:
      - Jürgen Melzer (AUT) / Philipp Petzschner (GER) [7] def. Lukáš Dlouhý (CZE) / Leander Paes (IND) [3] 7–6(9), 4–6, [10–8]
      - Mariusz Fyrstenberg (POL) / Marcin Matkowski (POL) [6] def. Bob Bryan (USA) / Mike Bryan (USA) [1] 2–6, 7–6(4), [10–8]
        - Standings: Fyrstenberg/Matkowski 2–0, Bryan/Bryan, Melzer/Petzschner 1–1, Dlouhý/Paes 0–2.
- Asian Games in Guangzhou, China:
  - Men's Final: (gold) **Somdev Devvarman** (IND) def. (silver) Denis Istomin (UZB) 6–1, 6–2
  - Women's final: (gold) **Peng Shuai** (CHN) def. (silver) Akgul Amanmuradova (UZB) 7–5, 6–2

=== November 22, 2010 (Monday) ===
==== American football ====
- NFL Monday Night Football, Week 11: San Diego Chargers 35, Denver Broncos 14
- The Minnesota Vikings fire head coach Brad Childress and name defensive coordinator Leslie Frazier as interim replacement.

==== Baseball ====
- Major League Baseball awards:
  - National League Most Valuable Player: Joey Votto, Cincinnati Reds
    - Votto becomes the first Red to win the Award since Barry Larkin in 1995.

==== Cricket ====
- Pakistan vs South Africa in UAE:
  - 2nd Test in Abu Dhabi, day 3: South Africa 584/9d; Pakistan 317/6 (106 overs). Pakistan trail by 267 runs with 4 wickets remaining in the 1st innings.
- New Zealand in India:
  - 3rd Test in Nagpur, day 3: New Zealand 193 and 24/1 (11 overs); India 566/8d (165 overs; Rahul Dravid 191). New Zealand trail by 349 runs with 9 wickets remaining.

==== Football (soccer) ====
- Asian Games in Guangzhou, China:
  - Women:
    - Bronze medal match: (bronze) **South Korea** 2–0 China
    - Final: (silver) North Korea 0–1 (gold) **Japan**

==== Tennis ====
- ATP World Tour:
  - Barclays ATP World Tour Finals in London, United Kingdom, day 2:
    - Singles – Group A:
      - Novak Djokovic (SRB) [3] def. Tomáš Berdych (CZE) [6] 6–3, 6–3
      - Rafael Nadal (ESP) [1] def. Andy Roddick (USA) [8] 3–6, 7–6(3), 6–4
    - Doubles – Group B:
      - Mahesh Bhupathi (IND) / Max Mirnyi (BLR) [3] def. Łukasz Kubot (POL) / Oliver Marach (AUT) [5] 7–6(2), 6–4
      - Daniel Nestor (CAN) / Nenad Zimonjić (SRB) [2] def. Wesley Moodie (RSA) / Dick Norman (BEL) [7] 6–1, 6–2

=== November 21, 2010 (Sunday) ===
==== American football ====
- NFL Week 11:
  - Buffalo Bills 49, Cincinnati Bengals 31
  - Dallas Cowboys 35, Detroit Lions 19
  - Washington Redskins 19, Tennessee Titans 16 (OT)
  - Kansas City Chiefs 31, Arizona Cardinals 13
  - Green Bay Packers 31, Minnesota Vikings 3
  - New York Jets 30, Houston Texans 27
  - Pittsburgh Steelers 35, Oakland Raiders 3
  - Baltimore Ravens 37, Carolina Panthers 13
  - Jacksonville Jaguars 24, Cleveland Browns 20
  - Tampa Bay Buccaneers 21, San Francisco 49ers 0
  - New Orleans Saints 34, Seattle Seahawks 19
  - Atlanta Falcons 34, St. Louis Rams 17
  - New England Patriots 31, Indianapolis Colts 28
  - Sunday Night Football: Philadelphia Eagles 27, New York Giants 17

==== Auto racing ====
- Chase for the Sprint Cup:
  - Ford 400 in Homestead, Florida: (1) (Missouri) Carl Edwards (Ford, Roush Fenway Racing) (2) (California) Jimmie Johnson (Chevrolet, Hendrick Motorsports) (3) (California) Kevin Harvick (Chevrolet, Richard Childress Racing)
    - Final drivers' championship standings: (1) Johnson 6622 points (2) (Virginia) Denny Hamlin (Toyota, Joe Gibbs Racing) 6583 (3) Harvick 6581
      - Johnson extends his record streak of Cup Series championships to five. He also becomes the first driver in the seven-year history of the Chase, and the fourth overall, to overcome a points deficit in the season's final race.
- V8 Supercars:
  - Norton 360 Sandown Challenge, Race 24 in Melbourne, Victoria: (1) James Courtney (AUS) (Ford Falcon) (2) Mark Winterbottom (AUS) (Ford Falcon) (3) Jamie Whincup (AUS) (Holden Commodore)
    - Drivers' championship standings (after 24 of 26 races): (1) Courtney 2932 points (2) Whincup 2879 (3) Winterbottom 2729
- World Touring Car Championship:
  - Guia Race of Macau:
    - Round 21: (1) Rob Huff (GBR) (Chevrolet; Chevrolet Cruze) (2) Yvan Muller (FRA) (Chevrolet; Chevrolet Cruze) (3) Tiago Monteiro (ITA) (SR-Sport; SEAT León)
    - Round 22: (1) Norbert Michelisz (HUN) (Zengő Dension-Team; SEAT León) (2) Gabriele Tarquini (ITA) (SR-Sport; SEAT León) (3) Huff
      - Final drivers' championship standings: (1) Muller 331 points (2) Tarquini 276 (3) Huff 276
      - Final manufacturers' championship standings: (1) Chevrolet 715 points (2) SEAT Customers Technology 641 (3) BMW 580

==== Canadian football ====
- CFL Playoffs:
  - Division finals:
    - East in Montreal: **Montreal Alouettes** 48, Toronto Argonauts 17
    - West in Calgary: **Saskatchewan Roughriders** 20, Calgary Stampeders 16

==== Cricket ====
- Pakistan vs South Africa in UAE:
  - 2nd Test in Abu Dhabi, day 2: South Africa 584/9d (153 overs; AB de Villiers 278*, Tanvir Ahmed 6/120); Pakistan 59/1 (18 overs). Pakistan trail by 525 runs with 9 wickets remaining in the 1st innings.
    - De Villiers compiles the highest individual score by a South African in a Test innings, surpassing Graeme Smith's 277 against England in 2003.
- New Zealand in India:
  - 3rd Test in Nagpur, day 2: New Zealand 193 (66.3 overs); India 292/2 (82 overs). India lead by 99 runs with 8 wickets remaining in the 1st innings.

==== Cross-country skiing ====
- World Cup in Gällivare, Sweden:
  - Men's 4x10 km: (gold) Sweden I 1:29:56.3 (silver) Russia I 1:29:57.1 (bronze) Norway I 1:30:44.2
  - Women's 4x5 km: (gold) Norway I 50:16.0 (silver) Sweden I 50:42.8 (bronze) Italy I 51:12.2

==== Equestrianism ====
- Show jumping:
  - FEI World Cup Western European League:
    - 5th competition in Stuttgart (CSI 5*-W): (gold) Carsten-Otto Nagel (GER) on Corradina (silver) Marcus Ehning (GER) on Küchengirl (bronze) Billy Twomey (IRL) on Tinka's Serenade
      - Standings (after 5 of 13 competitions): (1) Kevin Staut (FRA) 43 points (2) Christian Ahlmann (GER) 40 (3) Meredith Michaels-Beerbaum (GER) 37
- Dressage:
  - Stuttgart German Masters in Stuttgart (CDI 5*):
    - Grand Prix Spécial: (gold) Isabell Werth (GER) on El Santo NRW (silver) Victoria Max-Theurer (AUT) on Augustin OLD (bronze) Edward Gal (NED) on Sisther de Jeu

==== Football (soccer) ====
- Sudamericano Femenino in Ecuador: (teams in **bold** qualify for the 2011 FIFA Women's World Cup)
  - Second stage:
    - **Colombia** 1–0 Argentina
    - Chile 1–3 **Brazil**
      - Final standings: Brazil 9 points, Colombia 4, Chile 2, Argentina 1.
- (United States) MLS Cup in Toronto, Ontario, Canada:
  - FC Dallas 1–2 **Colorado Rapids** (a.e.t.)
    - The Rapids win the Cup for the first time.

==== Golf ====
- European Tour:
  - Hong Kong Open in Sheung Shui, Hong Kong:
    - Winner: Ian Poulter (ENG) 258 (−22)
      - Poulter wins his tenth European Tour title.

==== Snooker ====
- Players Tour Championship:
  - Euro Event 6 in Prague:
    - Final: **Michael Holt** (ENG) 4–3 John Higgins (SCO)
      - Holt wins his first professional title.
      - Final Order of Merit: (1) Shaun Murphy (ENG) 23,200 (2) Mark Selby (ENG) 21,300 (3) Barry Pinches (ENG) 19,100

==== Speed skating ====
- World Cup 2 in Berlin, Germany:
  - 1000 m women: (gold) Christine Nesbitt (CAN) 1:15.86 (silver) Heather Richardson (USA) 1:16.31 (bronze) Margot Boer (NED) 1:16.51
    - Standings (after 2 of 8 races): (1) Nesbitt 200 points (2) Boer 150 (3) Richardson 130
  - 1000 m men: (gold) Shani Davis (USA) 1:08.82 (silver) Lee Kyu-Hyeok (KOR) 1:09.08 (bronze) Simon Kuipers (NED) 1:09.11
    - Standings (after 2 of 8 races): (1) Davis 200 points (2) Kuipers 140 (3) Stefan Groothuis (NED) 130
  - Team Pursuit women: (gold) Germany 3:04.91 (silver) Netherlands 3:05.50 (bronze) Norway 3:06.67
  - Team Pursuit men: (gold) United States 3:43.10 (silver) Norway 3:44.65 (bronze) Netherlands 3:45.38

==== Tennis ====
- ATP World Tour:
  - Barclays ATP World Tour Finals in London, United Kingdom, day 1:
    - Singles – Group B:
      - Andy Murray (GBR) [5] def. Robin Söderling (SWE) [4] 6–2, 6–4
      - Roger Federer (SUI) [2] def. David Ferrer (ESP) [7] 6–1, 6–4
    - Doubles – Group A:
      - Bob Bryan (USA) / Mike Bryan (USA) [1] def. Jürgen Melzer (AUT) / Philipp Petzschner (GER) [8] 6–3, 7–5
      - Mariusz Fyrstenberg (POL) / Marcin Matkowski (POL) [6] def. Lukáš Dlouhý (CZE) / Leander Paes (IND) [4] 6–3, 7–6(3)

=== November 20, 2010 (Saturday) ===
==== American football ====
- NCAA (unbeaten teams in **bold**):
  - BCS Top 10:
    - (5) LSU 43, Ole Miss 36
    - The Big Game: (6) Stanford 48, California 14
    - (7) Wisconsin 48, Michigan 28
      - Michigan quarterback Denard Robinson becomes the first player in NCAA history to rush for 1,500 yards and pass for 1,500 yards in a season.
    - (19) Texas A&M 9, (8) Nebraska 6
    - (9) Ohio State 20, (20) Iowa 17
    - (10) Oklahoma State 48, Kansas 14
  - Played earlier this week: (4) **Boise State**
  - Idle: (1) **Oregon**, (2) **Auburn**, (3) **TCU**
  - Other games:
    - (13) Arkansas 38, (21) Mississippi State 31 (2OT)
    - (16) Virginia Tech 31, (24) Miami 17
      - The Hokies win the ACC Coastal Division title and book a place in the ACC Championship Game.
    - Northern Illinois 59, Ball State 21
      - The Huskies clinch the MAC West Division title and book a place in the MAC Championship Game.

==== Auto racing ====
- Nationwide Series:
  - Ford 300 in Homestead, Florida: (1) (Nevada) Kyle Busch (Toyota; Joe Gibbs Racing) (2) (California) Kevin Harvick (Chevrolet; Kevin Harvick Inc.) (3) (Michigan) Brad Keselowski (Dodge; Penske Racing)
    - Final drivers' championship standings: (1) Keselowski 5639 points (2) (Missouri) Carl Edwards (Ford; Roush Fenway Racing) 5194 (3) Busch 4934
- V8 Supercars:
  - Norton 360 Sandown Challenge, Race 23 in Melbourne, Victoria: (1) Paul Dumbrell (AUS) (Ford Falcon) (2) Jamie Whincup (AUS) (Holden Commodore) (3) Mark Winterbottom (AUS) (Ford Falcon)
    - Drivers' championship standings (after 23 of 26 races): (1) James Courtney (AUS) (Ford Falcon) 2782 points (2) Whincup 2750 (3) Winterbottom 2591

==== Canadian football ====
- CIS football:
  - National Semifinals:
    - Uteck Bowl: **Laval Rouge et Or** 13, Western Ontario Mustangs 11
    - Mitchell Bowl: **Calgary Dinos** 35, Saint Mary's Huskies 8

==== Cricket ====
- Pakistan vs South Africa in UAE:
  - 2nd Test in Abu Dhabi, day 1: South Africa 311/5 (90 overs; AB de Villiers 120*, Jacques Kallis 105); Pakistan.
- New Zealand in India:
  - 3rd Test in Nagpur, day 1: New Zealand 148/7 (56 overs); India.

==== Cross-country skiing ====
- World Cup in Gällivare, Sweden:
  - Men's 15 km Freestyle: (gold) Marcus Hellner (SWE) 32:26.0 (silver) Dario Cologna (SUI) 32:37.4 (bronze) Daniel Rickardsson (SWE) 32:46.1
  - Women's 10 km Freestyle: (gold) Marit Bjørgen (NOR) 23:48.4 (silver) Charlotte Kalla (SWE) 24:29.5 (bronze) Arianna Follis (ITA) 24:39.8

==== Equestrianism ====
- Dressage:
  - Stuttgart German Masters in Stuttgart (CDI 5*):
    - Grand Prix Freestyle: (gold) Isabell Werth (GER) on Satchmo (silver) Ulla Salzgeber (GER) on Herzruf's Erbe (bronze) Hubertus Schmidt (GER) on Dark Diamond
- Four-in-hand driving:
  - FEI World Cup:
    - 2nd competition in Stuttgart (CAI-W): (gold) Boyd Exell (AUS) (silver) Koos de Ronde (NED) (bronze) IJsbrand Chardon (NED)
- Show jumping:
  - FEI World Cup North American League – West Coast:
    - 11th competition in Burbank (CSI 2*-W): (gold) Ashlee Bond (USA) on Cadett (silver) Richard Spooner (USA) on Cristallo (bronze) Harley Brown (AUS) on Cassiato

==== Figure skating ====
- ISU Grand Prix:
  - Rostelecom Cup in Moscow, Russia: (skaters in **bold** qualify for the Final)
    - Men: (gold) **Tomáš Verner** (CZE) 230.31 (silver) **Patrick Chan** (CAN) 227.21 (bronze) Jeremy Abbott (USA) 217.21
      - Standings (after 5 of 6 events): **Daisuke Takahashi** (JPN) 30 points (2 events), Chan 28 (2), Verner, Nobunari Oda (JPN) 26 (2), Abbott 24 (2), Adam Rippon (USA) 20 (2), Takahiko Kozuka (JPN) 15 (1)... Brandon Mroz (USA) 13 (1), Florent Amodio (FRA), Armin Mahbanoozadeh (USA) 11 (1).
    - Pairs: (gold) Yuko Kavaguti / Alexander Smirnov (RUS) 182.70 (silver) Narumi Takahashi / Mervin Tran (JPN) 55.90 165.47 (bronze) Amanda Évora / Mark Ladwig (USA) 162.85
      - Standings (after 5 of 6 events): **Pang Qing / Tong Jian** (CHN) 30 points (2 events), **Kirsten Moore-Towers / Dylan Moscovitch** (CAN) 26 (2), **Lubov Iliushechkina / Nodari Maisuradze** (RUS), **Sui Wenjing / Han Cong** (CHN), Takahashi / Tran 24 (2), Caitlin Yankowskas / John Coughlin (USA) 20 (2)... Aliona Savchenko / Robin Szolkowy (GER), Kavaguti / Smirnov 15 (1), Vera Bazarova / Yuri Larionov (RUS) 13 (1).
    - Ladies: (gold) **Miki Ando** (JPN) 174.47 (silver) **Akiko Suzuki** (JPN) 172.74 (bronze) Ashley Wagner (USA) 167.02
      - Standings (after 5 of 6 events): Ando 30 points (2 events), **Carolina Kostner** (ITA), **Kanako Murakami** (JPN), Suzuki, **Rachael Flatt** (USA) 26 points (2 events), Wagner, Amélie Lacoste (CAN) 18 (2)... Alissa Czisny (USA) 15 (1).
    - Ice Dancing: (gold) **Ekaterina Bobrova / Dmitri Soloviev** (RUS) 154.33 (silver) Nóra Hoffmann / Maxim Zavozin (HUN) 142.09 (bronze) Elena Ilinykh / Nikita Katsalapov (RUS) 134.79
      - Standings (after 5 of 6 events): **Meryl Davis / Charlie White** (USA) 30 points (2 events), **Vanessa Crone / Paul Poirier** (CAN), Bobrova / Soloviev 28 (2), Kaitlyn Weaver / Andrew Poje (CAN), Hoffmann / Zavozin, Maia Shibutani / Alex Shibutani (USA) 22 (2)... Nathalie Péchalat / Fabian Bourzat (FRA) 15 (1), Sinead Kerr / John Kerr (GBR) 13 (1), Madison Chock / Greg Zuerlein (USA) 11 (1).

==== Football (soccer) ====
- 2011 FIFA Women's World Cup qualification:
  - UEFA-CONCACAF play-off, first leg in Parma: Italy 0–1 United States

==== Mixed martial arts ====
- UFC 123 in Auburn Hills, Michigan:
  - Lightweight bout: George Sotiropoulos (AUS) def. Joe Lauzon (USA) by submission (kimura)
  - Light Heavyweight bout: Phil Davis (USA) def. Tim Boetsch (USA) by submission (modified kimura)
  - Middleweight bout: Maiquel Falcão (BRA) def. Gerald Harris (USA) by unanimous decision (29–27, 29–28, 29–28)
  - Welterweight bout: B.J. Penn (USA) def. Matt Hughes (USA) by knockout (punches)
  - Light Heavyweight bout: Quinton Jackson (USA) def. Lyoto Machida (BRA) by split decision (28–29, 29–28, 29–28)

==== Rugby union ====
- End of year tests:
  - Week 5:
    - Italy 14–32 Australia in Florence
    - Georgia 22–15 Canada in Tbilisi
    - England 26–13 Samoa in London
    - Scotland 21–17 South Africa in Edinburgh
    - Portugal 24–12 Namibia in Coimbra
    - Ireland 18–38 New Zealand in Dublin
    - France 15–9 Argentina in Montpellier

==== Snowboarding ====
- World Cup in Stockholm, Sweden:
  - Big Air: (gold) Sébastien Toutant (CAN) (silver) Petja Piiroinen (FIN) (bronze) Patrick Burgener (SUI)
    - Standings (after 2 of 4 events): (1) Toutant 1220 points (2) Ståle Sandbech (NOR) 1090 (3) Marko Grilc (SLO) 1018
    - Overall: (1) Toutant 1220 points (2) Seppe Smits (BEL) 1180 (3) Tore Viken Holvik (NOR) 1150

==== Speed skating ====
- World Cup 2 in Berlin, Germany:
  - 500 m men: (gold) Pekka Koskela (FIN) 34.90 (silver) Tucker Fredricks (USA) 34.91 (bronze) Lee Kang-Seok (KOR) 35.13
    - Standings (after 4 of 12 races): (1) Joji Kato (JPN) 330 points (2) Lee Kang-Seok 290 (3) Lee Kyu-Hyeok (KOR) 235
  - 500 m women: (gold) Jenny Wolf (GER) 37.98 (silver) Margot Boer (NED) 38.46 (bronze) Lee Sang-Hwa (KOR) 38.56
    - Standings (after 4 of 12 races): (1) Wolf 400 points (2) Boer 300 (3) Lee 270
  - 3000 m women: (gold) Jilleanne Rookard (USA) 4:04.38 (silver) Martina Sáblíková (CZE) 4:05.83 (bronze) Stephanie Beckert (GER) 4:06.12
    - Standings (after 2 of 6 races): (1) Beckert 170 points (2) Rookard 140 (3) Kristina Groves (CAN) 120
  - 1500 m men: (gold) Håvard Bøkko (NOR) 1:45.27 (silver) Trevor Marsicano (USA) 1:46.15 (bronze) Stefan Groothuis (NED) 1:46.31
    - Standings (after 2 of 6 races): (1) Shani Davis (USA) 140 points (2) Bøkko 132 (3) Groothuis 130

=== November 19, 2010 (Friday) ===
==== American football ====
- NCAA BCS Top 10 (unbeaten team in **bold**):
  - Battle for the Milk Can: (4) **Boise State** 51, Fresno State 0

==== Baseball ====
- Asian Games in Guangzhou, China:
  - Bronze medal match: China 2–6 (bronze) **Japan**
  - Final: (gold) **South Korea** 9–3 (silver) Chinese Taipei

==== Cricket ====
- West Indies in Sri Lanka:
  - 1st Test in Galle, day 5: West Indies 580/9d; Sri Lanka 378 and 241/4 (f/o, 81.2 overs). **Match drawn; 3-match series level 0–0.**

==== Figure skating ====
- ISU Grand Prix:
  - Rostelecom Cup in Moscow, Russia:
    - Men Short Program: (1) Patrick Chan (CAN) 81.96 (2) Jeremy Abbott (USA) 77.61 (3) Tomáš Verner (CZE) 74.10
    - Pairs Short Program: (1) Yuko Kavaguti / Alexander Smirnov (RUS) 61.91 (2) Narumi Takahashi / Mervin Tran (JPN) 55.90 (3) Katarina Gerboldt / Alexander Enbert (RUS) 53.62
    - Ladies Short Program: (1) Akiko Suzuki (JPN) 57.43 (2) Agnes Zawadzki (USA) 56.84 (3) Ashley Wagner (USA) 56.17
    - Ice Dance Short Dance: (1) Ekaterina Bobrova / Dmitri Soloviev (RUS) 60.80 (2) Federica Faiella / Massimo Scali (ITA) 57.65 (3) Nóra Hoffmann / Maxim Zavozin (HUN) 57.24

==== Football (soccer) ====
- Sudamericano Femenino in Ecuador: (teams in **bold** qualify for the 2011 FIFA Women's World Cup)
  - Second stage:
    - Chile 0–0 Argentina
    - **Brazil** 5–0 Colombia
      - Standings (after 2 matches): Brazil 6 points, Chile 2, Argentina 1, Colombia 1.

==== Rugby union ====
- End of year tests:
  - Week 5:
    - Italy A 9–16 Tonga in Biella
    - Scotland A 25–0 United States in Galashiels
    - Wales 16–16 Fiji in Cardiff

==== Speed skating ====
- World Cup 2 in Berlin, Germany:
  - 500 m women: (gold) Jenny Wolf (GER) 38.08 (silver) Lee Sang-Hwa (KOR) 38.24 (bronze) Margot Boer (NED) 38.66
    - Standings (after 3 of 12 races): (1) Wolf 300 points (2) Boer 220 (3) Lee 200
  - 500 m men: (gold) Joji Kato (JPN) 35.03 (silver) Jan Smeekens (NED) 35.04 (bronze) Lee Kang-Seok (KOR) 35.10
    - Standings (after 3 of 12 races): (1) Kato 280 points (2) Lee 220 (3) Keiichiro Nagashima (JPN) 181
  - 1500 m women: (gold) Christine Nesbitt (CAN) 1:57.03 (silver) Ida Njåtun (NOR) 1:57.99 (bronze) Ireen Wüst (NED) 1:58.93
    - Standings (after 2 of 6 races): (1) Nesbitt 200 points (2) Wüst 150 (3) Cindy Klassen (CAN) 120
  - 5000 m men: (gold) Lee Seung-Hoon (KOR) 6:18.40 (silver) Jonathan Kuck (USA) 6:18.85 (bronze) Håvard Bøkko (NOR) 6:19.50
    - Standings (after 2 of 6 races): (1) Bob de Jong (NED) 160 points (2) Lee 140 (3) Kuck 140

=== November 18, 2010 (Thursday) ===
==== American football ====
- NFL Thursday Night Football, Week 11: Chicago Bears 16, Miami Dolphins 0

==== Baseball ====
- Major League Baseball awards:
  - American League Cy Young Award: Félix Hernández, Seattle Mariners

==== Basketball ====
- Euroleague:
  - Regular Season, matchday 5:
    - Group A:
      - Žalgiris Kaunas (Lithuania) 73–65 (Russia) Khimki Moscow
      - Maccabi Tel Aviv (Israel) 99–58 (Poland) Asseco Prokom Gdynia
    - Group B: Brose Baskets (Germany) 65–69 (Spain) Unicaja Málaga
    - Group D:
      - Efes Pilsen Istanbul (Turkey) 86–72 (Russia) CSKA Moscow
      - Armani Jeans Milano (Italy) 71–81 (Greece) Panathinaikos Athens

==== Cricket ====
- West Indies in Sri Lanka:
  - 1st Test in Galle, day 4: West Indies 580/9d; Sri Lanka 378 (95.2 overs) and 89/0 (f/o, 22 overs). Sri Lanka trail by 113 runs with 10 wickets remaining.

==== Football (soccer) ====
- Copa Sudamericana Semifinals, first leg:
  - LDU Quito (Ecuador) 2–3 (Argentina) Independiente

==== Snooker ====
- Premier League week 10 in Llandudno: (players in **bold** advance to the semi-finals)
  - **Ronnie O'Sullivan** (ENG) 5–1 Mark Selby (ENG)
  - **Shaun Murphy** (ENG) 2–4 **Neil Robertson** (AUS)
    - Final standings: O'Sullivan 9 points, **Marco Fu** (HKG) 8, Murphy 6, Robertson, Mark Williams (WAL), Selby 5, Ding Junhui (CHN) 4.

=== November 17, 2010 (Wednesday) ===
==== Baseball ====
- Major League Baseball awards:
  - Manager of the Year:
    - American League: Ron Gardenhire, Minnesota Twins
    - National League: Bud Black, San Diego Padres

==== Basketball ====
- Euroleague:
  - Regular Season, matchday 5:
    - Group A: Partizan Belgrade (Serbia) 74–71 (Spain) Caja Laboral
    - Group B:
      - Spirou Basket (Belgium) 67–49 (Spain) Real Madrid
      - Virtus Roma (Italy) 71–86 (Greece) Olympiacos Piraeus
    - Group C:
      - Lietuvos Rytas (Lithuania) 90–62 (Croatia) KK Cibona Zagreb
      - Cholet Basket (France) 82–78 (Turkey) Fenerbahçe Ülker
      - Montepaschi Siena (Italy) 76–67 (Spain) Regal FC Barcelona
    - Group D: Union Olimpija Ljubljana (Slovenia) 72–68 (Spain) Power Electronics Valencia

==== Cricket ====
- West Indies in Sri Lanka:
  - 1st Test in Galle, day 3: West Indies 580/9d; Sri Lanka 165/3 (43.1 overs). Sri Lanka trail by 415 runs with 7 wickets remaining in the 1st innings.

==== Football (soccer) ====
- Sudamericano Femenino in Ecuador:
  - Second stage:
    - Chile 1–1 Colombia
    - Brazil 4–0 Argentina
- UEFA Euro 2012 qualifying:
  - Group E: Finland 8–0 San Marino
    - Standings: Netherlands 12 points (4 matches), Hungary 9 (4), Sweden 6 (3), Moldova 6 (4), Finland 3 (4), San Marino 0 (5).
  - Group F: Croatia 3–0 Malta
    - Standings (after 4 matches): Croatia 10 points, Greece 8, Georgia 6, Israel, Latvia 4, Malta 0.
- Africa Cup of Nations qualification:
  - Group K:
    - Botswana 1–0 Tunisia
    - Togo 0–0 Chad
      - Standings: Botswana 13 points (5 matches), Tunisia 7 (5), Malawi 6 (4), Togo 3 (5), Chad 2 (5).
- Friendly international matches (selected):
  - Russia 0–2 Belgium
  - Argentina 1–0 Brazil in Doha, Qatar
  - Egypt 3–0 Australia
  - Austria 1–2 Greece
  - Netherlands 1–0 Turkey
  - Romania 1–1 Italy in Klagenfurt, Austria
  - Sweden 0–0 Germany
  - Republic of Ireland 1–2 Norway
  - Slovenia 1–2 Georgia
  - England 1–2 France
  - Portugal 4–0 Spain
  - Chile 2–0 Uruguay
- Copa Sudamericana Semifinals, first leg:
  - Goiás (Brazil) 0–1 (Brazil) Palmeiras

=== November 16, 2010 (Tuesday) ===
==== Baseball ====
- Major League Baseball awards:
  - National League Cy Young Award: Roy Halladay, Philadelphia Phillies
    - Halladay, the unanimous winner, becomes the fifth pitcher to win the Cy Young Award in both the National and American Leagues.

==== Cricket ====
- Pakistan vs South Africa in UAE:
  - 1st Test in Dubai, day 5: South Africa 380 and 318/2d; Pakistan 248 and 343/3 (117 overs; Younis Khan 131*). **Match drawn; 2-match series level 0–0.**
- New Zealand in India:
  - 2nd Test in Hyderabad, day 5: New Zealand 350 and 448/8d (135 overs; Brendon McCullum 225); India 472 and 68/0 (17 overs). **Match drawn; 3-match series level 0–0.**
- West Indies in Sri Lanka:
  - 1st Test in Galle, day 2: West Indies 580/9d (163.2 overs; Chris Gayle 333, Ajantha Mendis 6/169); Sri Lanka 54/1 (12.2 overs). Sri Lanka trail by 526 runs with 9 wickets remaining in the 1st innings.
    - Gayle becomes the fourth batsman to score multiple triple hundreds in Test cricket, after Donald Bradman, Brian Lara and Virender Sehwag.

==== Rugby union ====
- End of year tests:
  - Week 5:
    - Munster (Ireland) 15–6 Australia in Limerick

==== Table tennis ====
- Asian Games in Guangzhou, China:
  - Men's Team Final: (gold) **China** 3–0 (silver) South Korea
  - Women's Team Final: (gold) **China** 3–0 (silver) Singapore

==== Tennis ====
- Asian Games in Guangzhou, China:
  - Men's Team Final: (gold) **Chinese Taipei** 2–1 (silver) Uzbekistan
  - Women's Team Final: (gold) **China** 2–1 (silver) Chinese Taipei

=== November 15, 2010 (Monday) ===
==== American football ====
- NFL Monday Night Football, Week 10: Philadelphia Eagles 59, Washington Redskins 28
  - Eagles quarterback Michael Vick becomes the first quarterback to pass for at least 300 yards and four touchdowns, and rush for 50 yards and two touchdowns in a game. Vick also moves into second place for rushing yards by a quarterback, passing Steve Young.

==== Badminton ====
- Asian Games in Guangzhou, China:
  - Men's Team Final: (gold) **China** 3–1 (silver) South Korea
  - Women's Team Final: (gold) **China** 3–0 (silver) Thailand

==== Baseball ====
- Major League Baseball awards:
  - Rookies of the Year:
    - American League: Neftalí Feliz, Texas Rangers
    - National League: Buster Posey, San Francisco Giants

==== Cricket ====
- Pakistan vs South Africa in UAE:
  - 1st Test in Dubai, day 4: South Africa 380 and 318/2d (95 overs; Jacques Kallis 135*, Hashim Amla 118*); Pakistan 248 and 109/2 (41 overs). Pakistan require another 342 runs with 8 wickets remaining.
- New Zealand in India:
  - 2nd Test in Hyderabad, day 4: New Zealand 350 and 237/4 (75 overs; Brendon McCullum 124*); India 472 (143.4 overs; Harbhajan Singh 111*, Daniel Vettori 5/135). New Zealand lead by 115 runs with 6 wickets remaining.
- West Indies in Sri Lanka:
  - 1st Test in Galle, day 1: West Indies 362/2 (90 overs; Chris Gayle 219*); Sri Lanka.

==== Golf ====
- European Tour:
  - Barclays Singapore Open in Singapore:
    - Winner: Adam Scott (AUS) 267 (−17)
      - Scott wins the tournament for the third time and his seventh European Tour title.

=== November 14, 2010 (Sunday) ===
==== Alpine skiing ====
- Men's World Cup:
  - Slalom in Levi, Finland: (gold) Jean-Baptiste Grange (FRA) 1:46.64 (silver) André Myhrer (SWE) 1:46.97 (bronze) Ivica Kostelić (CRO) 1:47.61

==== American football ====
- NFL Week 10:
  - Buffalo Bills 14, Detroit Lions 12
  - Chicago Bears 27, Minnesota Vikings 13
  - New York Jets 26, Cleveland Browns 20 (OT)
  - Indianapolis Colts 23, Cincinnati Bengals 17
  - Miami Dolphins 29, Tennessee Titans 17
  - Tampa Bay Buccaneers 31, Carolina Panthers 16
  - Jacksonville Jaguars 31, Houston Texans 24
  - Denver Broncos 49, Kansas City Chiefs 29
  - Dallas Cowboys 33, New York Giants 20
  - Seattle Seahawks 36, Arizona Cardinals 18
  - San Francisco 49ers 23, St. Louis Rams 20 (OT)
  - Sunday Night Football: New England Patriots 39, Pittsburgh Steelers 26
  - Byes: Green Bay Packers, New Orleans Saints, Oakland Raiders, San Diego Chargers

==== Auto racing ====
- Formula One:
  - Abu Dhabi Grand Prix in Abu Dhabi: (1) Sebastian Vettel (GER) (Red Bull–Renault) (2) Lewis Hamilton (GBR) (McLaren–Mercedes) (3) Jenson Button (GBR) (McLaren-Mercedes)
    - Final drivers' championship standings: (1) Vettel 256 points (2) Fernando Alonso (ESP) (Ferrari) 252 (3) Mark Webber (AUS) (Red Bull-Renault) 242
      - Vettel becomes the youngest world champion, at the age of 23 years, 134 days.
    - Final constructors' championship standings: (1) Red Bull 498 points (2) McLaren 454 (3) Ferrari 396
- Chase for the Sprint Cup:
  - Kobalt Tools 500 in Avondale: (1) (Missouri) Carl Edwards (Ford; Roush Fenway Racing) (2) (Indiana) Ryan Newman (Chevrolet; Stewart Haas Racing) (3) (Connecticut) Joey Logano (Toyota; Joe Gibbs Racing)
    - Drivers' championship standings (after 35 of 36 races): (1) (Virginia) Denny Hamlin (Toyota; Joe Gibbs Racing) 6462 points (2) (California) Jimmie Johnson (Chevrolet; Hendrick Motorsports) 6447 (3) (California) Kevin Harvick (Chevrolet; Richard Childress Racing) 6416
- World Rally Championship:
  - Wales Rally GB in Cardiff: (1) Sébastien Loeb (FRA)/Daniel Elena (MON) (Citroën C4 WRC) (2) Petter Solberg (NOR)/Chris Patterson (GBR) (Citroën C4 WRC) (3) Jari-Matti Latvala (FIN)/Miikka Anttila (FIN) (Ford Focus RS WRC 09)
    - Final drivers' championship standings: (1) Loeb 276 points (2) Latvala 171 (3) Solberg 169
- V8 Supercars:
  - Falken Tasmania Challenge, Race 22 in Launceston, Tasmania: (1) Mark Winterbottom (AUS) (Ford Falcon) (2) Paul Dumbrell (AUS) (Ford Falcon) (3) Jason Bright (AUS) (Holden Commodore)
    - Drivers' championship standings (after 22 of 26 races): (1) James Courtney (AUS) (Ford Falcon) 2662 points (2) Jamie Whincup (AUS) (Holden Commodore) 2612 (3) Winterbottom 2462

==== Canadian football ====
- CFL Playoffs:
  - Division semifinals:
    - East in Hamilton, Ontario: **Toronto Argonauts** 16, Hamilton Tiger-Cats 13
    - West in Regina, Saskatchewan: **Saskatchewan Roughriders** 41, BC Lions 38 (2OT)

==== Cricket ====
- Pakistan vs South Africa in UAE:
  - 1st Test in Dubai, day 3: South Africa 380 and 139/2 (48 overs); Pakistan 248 (95 overs; Morné Morkel 5/54). South Africa lead by 271 runs with 8 wickets remaining.
- New Zealand in India:
  - 2nd Test in Hyderabad, day 3: New Zealand 350; India 436/9 (134 overs). India lead by 86 runs with 1 wicket remaining in the 1st innings.

==== Equestrianism ====
- Show jumping:
  - FEI World Cup Central European League – North Sub-League:
    - 6th competition in Leszno (CSI 3*-W): (gold) Jannike West (SWE) on Vivaldi K (silver) Arne van Heel (NED) on Zeitzeuge (bronze) Thomas Kleis (GER) on Crocant
  - FEI World Cup South American League:
    - 5th competition in Capilla del Señor (CSIO 4*-W): (gold) Leandro Moschini (ARG) on Gama Zarello (silver) Carlos Milthaler (CHI) on As Hyo Altanero (bronze) Ricardo Dircie (ARG) on Llavaneras H.J. Aries

==== Figure skating ====
- ISU Grand Prix:
  - Skate America in Portland, Oregon: (skaters in **bold** qualify for the Final)
    - Ice Dance: (gold) **Meryl Davis / Charlie White** (USA) 156.68 (silver) **Vanessa Crone / Paul Poirier** (CAN) 149.08 (bronze) Maia Shibutani / Alex Shibutani (USA) 144.81
      - Standings (after 4 of 6 events): Davis / White 30 points (2 events), Crone / Poirier 28 (2), Kaitlyn Weaver / Andrew Poje (CAN), Shibutani / Shibutani 22 (2), Nathalie Péchalat / Fabian Bourzat (FRA) 15 (1), Sinead Kerr / John Kerr (GBR), Ekaterina Bobrova / Dmitri Soloviev (RUS) 13 (1), Federica Faiella / Massimo Scali (ITA), Madison Chock / Greg Zuerlein (USA) 11 (1).
    - Ladies: (gold) **Kanako Murakami** (JPN) 164.93 (silver) Rachael Flatt (USA) 162.86 (bronze) **Carolina Kostner** (ITA) 154.87
      - Standings (after 4 of 6 events): Kostner, Murakami, Flatt 26 points (2 events), Amélie Lacoste (CAN) 18 (2), Alissa Czisny (USA), Miki Ando (JPN) 15 (1), Ksenia Makarova (RUS), Akiko Suzuki (JPN) 13 (1)... Alena Leonova (RUS) 11 (1).

==== Football (soccer) ====
- African Women's Championship in Daveyton, South Africa:
  - 3rd place playoff: Cameroon 0–2 (bronze) **South Africa**
  - Final: (gold) **Nigeria** 4–2 (silver) Equatorial Guinea
    - Nigeria win the title for the eighth time from nine tournaments.
- Caribbean Championship Qualifying Group Stage Two: (teams in **bold** advance to the final tournament)
  - Group G in St. John's, Antigua and Barbuda:
    - Dominica 0–5 Suriname
    - **Antigua and Barbuda** 0–0 **Cuba**
      - Final standings: Cuba, Antigua and Barbuda 5 points, Suriname 4, Dominica 1.
- CAF Confederation Cup Semifinals, second leg: (first leg score in parentheses)
  - Al-Hilal (Sudan) 1–0 (0–1) (Tunisia) **CS Sfaxien**. 1–1 on aggregate; Sfaxien win 5–3 on penalties.
- OFC Champions League Group stage, matchday 2:
  - Group B: Waitakere United (New Zealand) 1–1 (New Zealand) Auckland City FC
    - Standings (after 2 matches): Auckland City, Waitakere United 4 points, (New Caledonia) AS Magenta 3 (2), (French Polynesia) AS Tefana 0 (2).
- (Russia) Russian Premier League, matchday 28 of 30: (teams in **bold** qualify for the Champions League, team in italics qualify for the Europa League)
  - **Zenit St. Petersburg** 5–0 Rostov
  - Spartak Nalchik 1–1 **CSKA Moscow**
    - Standings: Zenit 66 points, CSKA Moscow 58, **Rubin Kazan** 56, Spartak Moscow 48.
    - Zenit win the championship for the second time.
- Singapore Cup Final in Singapore:
  - Tampines Rovers (Singapore) 0–1 (Thailand) **Bangkok Glass**
- (Republic of Ireland) FAI Cup Final in Dublin:
  - **Sligo Rovers** 0–0 (2–0 pen.) Shamrock Rovers
    - Sligo Rovers win the Cup for the third time.
- (Norway) Norwegian Cup Final in Oslo:
  - Follo 0–2 **Strømsgodset**
    - Strømsgodset win the Cup for the fifth time.
- (United States) (Canada) MLS Cup Playoffs:
  - Western Conference Final in Carson, California:
    - Los Angeles Galaxy 0–3 **FC Dallas**

==== Golf ====
- PGA Tour Fall Series:
  - Children's Miracle Network Classic in Lake Buena Vista, Florida:
    - Winner: Robert Garrigus (USA) 267 (−21)
      - Garrigus wins his first PGA Tour title.
- European Tour:
  - Barclays Singapore Open in Singapore: Play will conclude on November 15 due to thunderstorms.
- LPGA Tour:
  - Lorena Ochoa Invitational in Guadalajara, Mexico:
    - Winner: In-Kyung Kim (KOR) 269 (−19)
      - Kim wins her third LPGA Tour title.

==== Snooker ====
- Players Tour Championship:
  - Euro Event 5 in Hamm, Germany:
    - Final: **John Higgins** (SCO) 4–2 Shaun Murphy (ENG)
    - Higgins wins his first tournament since his return from a six-month suspension following match-fixing allegations and 33rd professional title of his career.
    - Order of Merit (after 11 of 12 events): (1) Murphy 20,700 (2) Mark Selby (ENG) 19,900 (3) Barry Pinches (ENG) 18,900

==== Speed skating ====
- World Cup 1 in Heerenveen, Netherlands:
  - 500 m Men: (gold) Keiichiro Nagashima (JPN) 34.97 (silver) Joji Kato (JPN) 35.01 (bronze) Lee Kang-Seok (KOR) 35.10
    - Standings (after 2 of 12 races): (1) Kato 180 points (2) Lee 150 (3) Nagashima 136.
  - 1500 m Ladies: (gold) Christine Nesbitt (CAN) 1:56.00 (silver) Ireen Wüst (NED) 1:57.35 (bronze) Marrit Leenstra (NED) 1:57.68
  - 5000 m Men: (gold) Bob de Jong (NED) 6:17.31 (silver) Ivan Skobrev (RUS) 6:18.96 (bronze) Wouter olde Heuvel (NED) 6:20.93

==== Tennis ====
- ATP World Tour:
  - BNP Paribas Masters in Paris, France:
    - Final: **Robin Söderling** (SWE) def. Gaël Monfils (FRA) 7–6(1), 6–1
      - Söderling wins his first Masters 1000 title, and the sixth title of his career.

==== Volleyball ====
- Women's World Championship in Tokyo, Japan:
  - 11th place playoff: **Netherlands** 3–0 Cuba
  - 9th place playoff: **Poland** 3–0 China
  - 7th place playoff: Serbia 1–3 **Germany**
  - 5th place playoff: Italy 3–0 Turkey
  - 3rd place playoff: United States 2–3 (bronze) **Japan**
  - Final: (gold) **Russia** 3–2 (silver) Brazil
    - Russia win the title for the second straight time.
    - Most Valuable Player: Yekaterina Gamova (RUS)

=== November 13, 2010 (Saturday) ===
==== Alpine skiing ====
- Women's World Cup:
  - Slalom in Levi, Finland: (gold) Marlies Schild (AUT) 1:52.84 (silver) Maria Riesch (GER) 1:52.87 (bronze) Tanja Poutiainen (FIN) 1:53.18
    - Overall standings (after 2 of 38 races): (1) Riesch 125 points (2) Poutiainen 110 (3) Schild and Viktoria Rebensburg (GER) 100

==== American football ====
- NCAA (unbeaten teams in **bold**):
  - BCS Top 10:
    - (1) **Oregon** 15, California 13
    - Deep South's Oldest Rivalry: (2) **Auburn** 49, Georgia 31
      - The Tigers win the SEC West Division title and book a trip to Atlanta for the SEC Championship Game.
    - (3) **TCU** 40, San Diego State 35
    - (5) LSU 51, Louisiana–Monroe 0
    - (6) Stanford 17, Arizona State 13
    - (7) Wisconsin 83, Indiana 20
    - (8) Nebraska 20, Kansas 3
    - (9) Ohio State 38, Penn State 14
    - (10) Oklahoma State 33, Texas 16
  - Played earlier this week: (4) **Boise State**
  - Other games:
    - (12) Alabama 30, (19) Mississippi State 10
    - Northwestern 21, (13) Iowa 17
    - Notre Dame 28, (14) Utah 3
    - (17) Missouri 38, (24) Kansas State 28
    - (23) South Carolina 36, (22) Florida 14
      - The Gamecocks win the SEC East for the first time, earning a date against Auburn in the SEC Championship Game.

==== Auto racing ====
- Nationwide Series:
  - WYPALL* 200 Powered by Kimberly-Clark Professional in Avondale: (1) (Missouri) Carl Edwards (Ford; Roush Fenway Racing) (2) (California) Kevin Harvick (Chevrolet; Kevin Harvick Inc.) (3) (Connecticut) Joey Logano (Toyota; Joe Gibbs Racing)
    - Drivers' championship standings (after 34 of 35 races): (1) (Michigan) Brad Keselowski (Dodge; Penske Racing) 5474 points (2) Edwards 5044 (3) (Nevada) Kyle Busch (Toyota; Joe Gibbs Racing) 4739
- V8 Supercars:
  - Falken Tasmania Challenge, Race 21 in Launceston, Tasmania: (1) Craig Lowndes (AUS) (Holden Commodore) (2) Garth Tander (AUS) (Holden Commodore) (3) Greg Murphy (NZL) (Holden Commodore)
    - Drivers' championship standings (after 21 of 26 races): (1) James Courtney (AUS) (Ford Falcon) 2593 points (2) Jamie Whincup (AUS) (Holden Commodore) 2552 (3) Lowndes 2405

==== Cricket ====
- Pakistan vs South Africa in UAE:
  - 1st Test in Dubai, day 2: South Africa 380 (123 overs); Pakistan 144/2 (55 overs). Pakistan trail by 236 runs with 8 wickets remaining in the 1st innings.
- New Zealand in India:
  - 2nd Test in Hyderabad, day 2: New Zealand 350 (117.3 overs); India 178/2 (49 overs). India trail by 172 runs with 8 wickets remaining in the 1st innings.

==== Equestrianism ====
- Show jumping:
  - FEI World Cup North American League – West Coast:
    - 10th competition in Rancho Murieta (CSI 3*-W): (gold) Harley Brown (AUS) on Cassiato (silver) Helen McNaught (GBR) on Caballo (bronze) Mark Watring (PUR) on Green Sleeps Vioco

==== Fencing ====
- World Championships in Paris, France:
  - Men's team épée: (gold) France (Jean-Michel Lucenay, Ulrich Robeiri, Gauthier Grumier, Jérôme Jeannet) (silver) United States (Benjamin Bratton, Weston Kelsey, Cody Mattern, Benjamin (Benji) Ungar) (bronze) Hungary (Gábor Boczkó, András Rédli, Géza Imre, Péter Somfai)

==== Figure skating ====
- ISU Grand Prix:
  - Skate America in Portland, Oregon: (skaters in **bold** qualify for the Final)
    - Ladies Short Program: (1) Carolina Kostner (ITA) 60.28 (2) Kanako Murakami (JPN) 54.75 (3) Joshi Helgesson (SWE) 51.17
    - Short Dance: (1) Meryl Davis / Charlie White (USA) 63.62 (2) Vanessa Crone / Paul Poirier (CAN) 60.41 (3) Kaitlyn Weaver / Andrew Poje (CAN) 59.48
    - Men: (gold) **Daisuke Takahashi** (JPN) 227.07 (silver) Nobunari Oda (JPN) 226.09 (bronze) Armin Mahbanoozadeh (USA) 211.17
      - Standings (after 4 of 6 events): Takahashi 30 points (2 events), Oda 26 (2), Adam Rippon (USA) 20 (2), Patrick Chan (CAN), Takahiko Kozuka (JPN) 15 (1), Jeremy Abbott (USA), Brandon Mroz (USA) 13 (1), Tomáš Verner (CZE), Florent Amodio (FRA), Mahbanoozadeh 11 (1).
    - Pairs: (gold) Aliona Savchenko / Robin Szolkowy (GER) 197.70 (silver) **Kirsten Moore-Towers / Dylan Moscovitch** (CAN) 175.48 (bronze) Sui Wenjing / Han Cong (CHN) 170.07
      - Standings (after 4 of 6 events): **Pang Qing / Tong Jian** (CHN) 30 points (2 events), Moore-Towers / Moscovitch 26 (2), **Lubov Iliushechkina / Nodari Maisuradze** (RUS), Sui / Han 24 (2), Caitlin Yankowskas / John Coughlin (USA) 20 (2)... Savchenko / Szolkowy 15 (1), Vera Bazarova / Yuri Larionov (RUS) 13 (1), Paige Lawrence / Rudi Swiegers (CAN), Narumi Takahashi / Mervin Tran (JPN) 11 (1).

==== Football (soccer) ====
- Sudamericano Femenino in Ecuador: (teams in **bold** advance to the second round)
  - Group B:
    - Uruguay 0–8 **Colombia**
    - **Brazil** 3–0 Paraguay
      - Final standings: Brazil 12 points, Colombia 9, Paraguay 6, Venezuela 3, Uruguay 0.
- AFC Champions League Final, in Tokyo:
  - **Seongnam Ilhwa Chunma** (South Korea) 3–1 (Iran) Zob Ahan
    - Seongnam win the title for the second time, and qualify for the FIFA Club World Cup.
- CAF Champions League Final, second leg: (first leg score in parentheses)
  - Espérance ST (Tunisia) 1–1 (0–5) (Democratic Republic of the Congo) **TP Mazembe**. TP Mazembe win 6–1 on aggregate.
    - TP Mazembe win the title for the second successive time and fourth overall, and qualify for the FIFA Club World Cup.
- OFC Champions League Group stage, matchday 2:
  - Group A:
    - Lautoka (Fiji) 1–0 (Vanuatu) Amical
    - PRK Hekari United (Papua New Guinea) 4–0 (Solomon Islands) Koloale
      - Standings (after 2 matches): Lautoka 6 points, PRK Hekari United, Amical 3, Koloale 0.
  - Group B: AS Magenta (New Caledonia) 1–0 (French Polynesia) AS Tefana
    - Standings: (New Zealand) Auckland City, (New Zealand) Waitakere United 3 points (1 match), AS Magenta 3 (2), AS Tefana 0 (2).
- (United States) (Canada) MLS Cup Playoffs:
  - Eastern Conference Final in Commerce City, Colorado:
    - **Colorado Rapids** 1–0 San Jose Earthquakes
- (Belarus) Belarusian Premier League, matchday 32 of 33: (team in **bold** qualify for the Champions League, team in italics qualify for the Europa League)
  - Belshina 1–3 **BATE**
  - Shakhtyor 0–1 Neman Grodno
    - Standings: BATE 72 points, Shakhtyor 63, Minsk 57, Dinamo Minsk 56.
    - BATE win their fifth successive title and seventh in total.

==== Gymnastics ====
- Trampoline World Championships in Metz, France:
  - Double Mini Women: (gold) Corissa Boychuk (CAN) 70.500 (silver) Bianca Budler (RSA) 70.300 (bronze) Svetlana Balandina (RUS) 70.200
  - Tumbling Men: (gold) Viktor Kyforenko (UKR) 76.300 (silver) Yang Song (CHN) 75.400 (bronze) Andrey Krylov (RUS) 74.600
  - Synchro Men: (gold) China (Tu Xiao, Đông Đông) 53.800 (silver) France (Sebastien Martiny, Gregoire Pennes) 51.700 (bronze) Japan (Tetsuya Sotomura, Masaki Ito) 51.300
  - Trampoline Women: (gold) Li Dan (CHN) 40.300 (silver) Huang Shanshan (CHN) 39.800 (bronze) Rosannagh MacLennan (CAN) 39.300

==== Mixed martial arts ====
- UFC 122 in Oberhausen, Germany:
  - Welterweight bout: Duane Ludwig (USA) def. Nick Osipczak (ENG) via split decision (28–30, 29–28, 29–28).
  - Light Heavyweight bout: Krzysztof Soszynski (CAN) def. Goran Reljic (CRO) via unanimous decision (30–27, 30–27, 30–27).
  - Welterweight bout: Amir Sadollah (USA) def. Peter Sobotta (POL) via unanimous decision (30–27, 30–27, 30–27).
  - Lightweight bout: Dennis Siver (GER) def. Andre Winner (ENG) via submission (rear-naked choke) at 3:37 of round 1.
  - Middleweight bout: Yushin Okami (JPN) def. Nate Marquardt (USA) via unanimous decision (29–28, 29–28, 30–27).

==== Rugby league ====
- Four Nations Final in Brisbane: Australia 12–16 **New Zealand**
  - New Zealand win the title for the second time (previously as Tri-Nations).

==== Rugby union ====
- 2011 Rugby World Cup qualifying:
  - Final Place Play-off Qualification Final, first leg in Montevideo: Uruguay 21–21 Romania
- End of year tests:
  - Week 4:
    - Italy 16–22 Argentina in Verona
    - England 35–18 Australia in London
    - Ireland 20–10 Samoa in Dublin
    - Wales 25–29 South Africa in Cardiff
    - Portugal 17–22 United States in Lisbon
    - Spain 22–60 Canada in Madrid
    - France 34–12 Fiji in Nantes
    - Scotland 3–49 New Zealand in Edinburgh

==== Speed skating ====
- World Cup 1 in Heerenveen, Netherlands:
  - 500 m Ladies: (gold) Jenny Wolf (GER) 38.17 (silver) Margot Boer (NED) 38.54 (bronze) Nao Kodaira (JPN) 38.77
    - Standings (after 2 of 12 races): (1) Wolf 200 points (2) Boer 150 (3) Kodaira 130
  - 3000 m Ladies: (gold) Stephanie Beckert (GER) 4:04.38 (silver) Cindy Klassen (CAN) 4:07.19 (bronze) Kristina Groves (CAN) 4:08.01
  - 1500 m Men: (gold) Shani Davis (USA) 1:45.04 (silver) Simon Kuipers (NED) 1:45.48 (bronze) Mark Tuitert (NED) 1:45.95

==== Volleyball ====
- Women's World Championship in Tokyo, Japan:
  - 9th–12th places semifinals:
    - **Poland** 3–2 Netherlands
    - Cuba 1–3 **China**
  - 5th–8th places semifinals:
    - Germany 2–3 **Turkey**
    - Serbia 0–3 **Italy**
  - Semifinals:
    - **Russia** 3–1 United States
    - **Brazil** 3–2 Japan

=== November 12, 2010 (Friday) ===
==== American football ====
- NCAA BCS Top 10 (unbeaten team in **bold**):
  - (4) **Boise State** 52, Idaho 14

==== Cricket ====
- Pakistan vs South Africa in UAE:
  - 1st Test in Dubai, day 1: South Africa 311/3 (89.3 overs; Graeme Smith 100); Pakistan.
- New Zealand in India:
  - 2nd Test in Hyderabad, day 1: New Zealand 258/4 (90 overs; Tim McIntosh 102); India.

==== Equestrianism ====
- Show jumping:
  - FEI Nations Cup Promotional League – North and South America:
    - 2nd competition in Capilla del Señor (CSIO 4*-W): (gold) United States (silver) Canada (bronze) Argentina I
      - Standings (after 2 of 3 competitions): (1) Canada 11 points (2) Argentina 4 (3) Mexico 3

==== Fencing ====
- World Championships in Paris, France:
  - Women's team épée: (gold) Romania (Anca Măroiu, Simona Alexandru, Ana Maria Brânză, Loredana Iordăchioiu) (silver) Germany (Britta Heidemann, Imke Duplitzer, Monika Sozanska, Ricarda Multerer) (bronze) South Korea (Shin A-Lam, Jung Hyo-Jung, Oh Yun-Hee, Park Se-Ra)

==== Figure skating ====
- ISU Grand Prix:
  - Skate America in Portland, Oregon:
    - Pairs Short Program: (1) Aliona Savchenko / Robin Szolkowy (GER) 63.99 (2) Kirsten Moore-Towers / Dylan Moscovitch (CAN) 61.64 (3) Caydee Denney / Jeremy Barrett (USA) 58.49
    - Men's Short Program: (1) Nobunari Oda (JPN) 79.28 (2) Daisuke Takahashi (JPN) 78.12 (3) Adam Rippon (USA) 73.94

==== Football (soccer) ====
- Sudamericano Femenino in Ecuador: (teams in **bold** advance to the second round)
  - Group A:
    - Bolivia 2–1 Peru
    - Ecuador 1–0 **Argentina**
      - Final standings: Argentina, **Chile**, Ecuador 9 points, Bolivia 3, Peru 0.
- Caribbean Championship Qualifying Group Stage Two:
  - Group G in St. John's, Antigua and Barbuda:
    - Suriname 3–3 Cuba
    - Antigua and Barbuda 0–0 Dominica
      - Standing (after 2 matches): Cuba, Antigua and Barbuda 4 points, Suriname, Dominica 1.
- CAF Confederation Cup Semi-finals, second leg: (first leg score in parentheses)
  - **FUS Rabat** (Morocco) 0–1 (2–1) (Libya) Ittihad. 2–2 on aggregate; FUS Rabat win on away goals rule.

==== Gymnastics ====
- Trampoline World Championships in Metz, France:
  - Double Mini Men: (gold) Andre Lico (POR) 73.400 (silver) Austin White (USA) 73.000 (bronze) Evgeny Chernoivanov (RUS) 72.700
  - Tumbling Women: (gold) Anna Korobeynikova (RUS) 68.200 (silver) Elena Krasnokutskaya (RUS) 65.500 (bronze) Marine Debauve (FRA) 63.400
  - Synchro Women: (gold) Russia (Irina Karavayeva, Victoria Voronina) 47.500 (silver) Germany (Carina Baumgartner, Anna Dogonadze) 46.800 (bronze) Belarus (Tatsiana Piatrenia, Katsiaryna Mironava) 46.800
  - Trampoline Men: (gold) Dong Dong (CHN) 43.100 (silver) Ye Shuai (CHN) 43.100 (bronze) Yasuhiro Ueyama (JPN) 42.400

==== Speed skating ====
- World Cup 1 in Heerenveen, Netherlands:
  - 500 m Men: (gold) Joji Kato (JPN) 34.85 (silver) Lee Kang-Seok (KOR) 35.00 (bronze) Lee Kyu-Hyeok (KOR) 35.01
  - 500 m Ladies: (gold) Jenny Wolf (GER) 38.02 (silver) Lee Sang-Hwa (KOR) 38.30 (bronze) Margot Boer (NED) 38.39
  - 1000 m Ladies: (gold) Christine Nesbitt (CAN) 1:15.84 (silver) Margot Boer (NED) 1:16.50 (bronze) Ireen Wüst (NED) 1:16.75
  - 1000 m Men: (gold) Shani Davis (USA) 1:08.40 (silver) Stefan Groothuis (NED) 1:08.51 (bronze) Simon Kuipers (NED) 1:08.68

=== November 11, 2010 (Thursday) ===
==== American football ====
- NFL Thursday Night Football, Week 10: Atlanta Falcons 26, Baltimore Ravens 21

==== Basketball ====
- Euroleague:
  - Regular Season, matchday 4:
    - Group A: Khimki Moscow (Russia) 76–78 (Israel) Maccabi Tel Aviv
    - Group B: Real Madrid (Spain) 83–81 (OT) (Germany) Brose Baskets
    - Group C:
      - KK Cibona Zagreb (Croatia) 71–84 (France) Cholet Basket
      - Regal FC Barcelona (Spain) 69–55 (Lithuania) Lietuvos Rytas
    - Group D:
      - Power Electronics Valencia (Spain) 69–80 (Italy) Armani Jeans Milano
      - Panathinaikos Athens (Greece) 84–61 (Turkey) Efes Pilsen Istanbul

==== Fencing ====
- World Championships in Paris, France:
  - Men's team foil: (gold) China (Huang Liangcai, Lei Sheng, Zhu Jun, Zhang Liangliang) (silver) Italy (Valerio Aspromonte, Andrea Cassarà, Andrea Baldini, Stefano Barrera) (bronze) Japan (Suguru Awaji, Kenta Chida, Yuki Ota, Ryo Miyake)

==== Football (soccer) ====
- African Women's Championship in Daveyton, South Africa:
  - Semifinals: (the winners qualify for 2011 FIFA Women's World Cup)
    - **Nigeria** 5–1 Cameroon
    - **Equatorial Guinea** 3–1 (a.e.t.) South Africa
- Sudamericano Femenino in Ecuador:
  - Group B:
    - Venezuela 5–2 Uruguay
    - Colombia 1–2 Brazil
      - Standings: Brazil 9 points (3 matches), Colombia, Paraguay 6 (3), Venezuela 3 (4), Uruguay 0 (3).
- Copa Sudamericana Quarterfinals, second leg: (first leg score in parentheses)
  - **Independiente** (Argentina) 0–0 (2–2) (Colombia) Deportes Tolima. 2–2 on points, 2–2 on aggregate; Independiente win on away goals rule.
  - Avaí (Brazil) 0–1 (2–2) (Brazil) **Goiás**. Goiás win 4–1 on points.
- UEFA Women's Champions League Round of 16, second leg: (first leg score in parentheses)
  - **Arsenal** (England) 4–1 (0–2) (Spain) Rayo Vallecano. Arsenal win 4–3 on aggregate.
  - **Everton** (England) 1–1 (4–1) (Denmark) Brøndby. Everton win 5–2 on aggregate.

==== Snooker ====
- Premier League week 9 in Grimsby: (players in **bold** advance to the semi-finals, player in ~~strike~~ is eliminated)
  - **Shaun Murphy** (ENG) 4–2 Mark Williams (WAL)
  - **Ronnie O'Sullivan** (ENG) 5–1 Neil Robertson (AUS)
    - Standings: **Marco Fu** (HKG) 8 points (6 matches), O'Sullivan 7 (5), Murphy 6 (5), Williams 5 (6), Mark Selby (ENG) 5 (5), ~~Ding Junhui~~ (CHN) 4 (6), Robertson 3 (5).

=== November 10, 2010 (Wednesday) ===
==== Basketball ====
- Euroleague:
  - Regular Season, matchday 4 (unbeaten team in **bold**):
    - Group A:
      - Asseco Prokom Gdynia (Poland) 62–69 (Serbia) Partizan Belgrade
      - Caja Laboral (Spain) 88–92 (Lithuania) Žalgiris Kaunas
    - Group B:
      - Olympiacos Piraeus (Greece) 86–78 (Belgium) Spirou Basket
      - Unicaja Málaga (Spain) 104–83 (Italy) Virtus Roma
    - Group C: **Fenerbahçe Ülker** (Turkey) 81–68 (Italy) Montepaschi Siena
    - Group D: CSKA Moscow (Russia) 65–55 (Slovenia) Union Olimpija Ljubljana

==== Equestrianism ====
- Show jumping:
  - FEI World Cup North American League – East Coast:
    - 10th competition in Toronto (CSI 4*-W): (gold) Brianne Goutal (USA) on Ballade van het Indihoff (silver) Harrie Smolders (NED) on Regina Z (bronze) Robert Whitaker (GBR) on Omelli

==== Fencing ====
- World Championships in Paris, France:
  - Women's team foil: (gold) Italy (Elisa Di Francisca, Arianna Errigo, Valentina Vezzali, Ilaria Salvatori) (silver) Poland (Karolina Chlewińska, Anna Rybicka, Sylwia Gruchała, Katarzyna Kryczalo) (bronze) South Korea (Seo Mi-Jung, Nam Hyun-Hee, Jeon Hee-Sook, Oh Ha Na)

==== Football (soccer) ====
- Sudamericano Femenino in Ecuador: (teams in **bold** advance to the second round)
  - Group A:
    - Peru 1–3 **Chile**
    - Bolivia 3–4 Ecuador
      - Standings: Argentina 9 points (3 matches), Chile 9 (4), Ecuador 6 (3), Peru, Bolivia 0 (3).
- Caribbean Championship Qualifying Group Stage Two:
  - Group G in St. John's, Antigua and Barbuda:
    - Cuba 4–2 Dominica
    - Antigua and Barbuda 2–1 Suriname
- Copa Sudamericana Quarterfinals, second leg: (first leg score in parentheses)
  - **LDU Quito** (Ecuador) 1–0 (0–0) (Argentina) Newell's Old Boys. Quito win 4–1 on points.
  - **Palmeiras** (Brazil) 2–0 (1–1) (Brazil) Atlético Mineiro. Palmeiras win 4–1 on points.
- UEFA Women's Champions League Round of 16, second leg: (first leg score in parentheses)
  - Sparta Praha (Czech Republic) 0–1 (0–2) (Sweden) **Linköping**. Linköping win 3–0 on aggregate.
  - **Zvezda 2005 Perm** (Russia) 4–0 (1–1) (Norway) Røa. Zvezda 2005 Perm win 5–1 on aggregate.
  - **Lyon** (France) 5–0 (6–1) (Russia) Rossiyanka. Lyon win 11–1 on aggregate.
  - Fortuna Hjørring (Denmark) 0–3 (2–4) (Germany) **Duisburg**. Duisburg win 7–2 on aggregate.
  - Neulengbach (Austria) 0–9 (0–7) (Germany) **Turbine Potsdam**. Potsdam win 16–0 on aggregate.
  - **Juvisy** (France) 2–2 (a.e.t.) (2–1) (Italy) Torres. Juvisy win 4–3 on aggregate.

==== Volleyball ====
- Women's World Championship in Japan: (teams in **bold** advance to the semifinals)
  - Pool E in Tokyo:
    - Peru 0–3 China
    - Serbia 3–0 South Korea
    - Poland 3–1 Turkey
    - **Japan** 1–3 **Russia**
      - Final standings: Russia 14 points, Japan 12, Serbia 11, Turkey, Poland, China, South Korea 10, Peru 7.
  - Pool F in Nagoya:
    - Czech Republic 1–3 Thailand
    - **Brazil** 3–1 **United States**
    - Netherlands 1–3 Germany
    - Italy 2–3 Cuba
      - Final standings: Brazil 14 points, United States 12, Germany, Italy 11, Cuba 10, Netherlands, Thailand 9, Czech Republic 8.

=== November 9, 2010 (Tuesday) ===
==== Fencing ====
- World Championships in Paris, France:
  - Men's team sabre: (gold) Russia (Nikolay Kovalev, Veniamin Reshetnikov, Aleksey Yakimenko, Artem Zanin) (silver) Italy (Diego Occhuizzi, Aldo Montano, Luigi Tarantino, Luigi Samele) (bronze) Romania (Tiberiu Dolniceanu, Rareș Dumitrescu, Cosmin Hănceanu, Gelu Florin Zalomir)
  - Women's team sabre: (gold) Russia (Dina Galiakbarova, Yuliya Gavrilova, Sofiya Velikaya, Svetlana Kormilitsyna) (silver) Ukraine (Halyna Pundyk, Olha Kharlan, Olena Khomrova, Olha Zhovnir) (bronze) France (Cécilia Berder, Carole Vergne, Léonore Perrus, Solenne Mary)

==== Football (soccer) ====
- Sudamericano Femenino in Ecuador:
  - Group B:
    - Colombia 5–0 Venezuela
    - Paraguay 4–0 Uruguay
      - Standings: Brazil, Colombia 6 points (2 matches), Paraguay 6 (3), Uruguay 0 (2), Venezuela 0 (3).

==== Rugby union ====
- End of year tests:
  - Week 4:
    - Saracens (England) 20–6 United States in London
    - Leicester Tigers (England) 15–26 Australia in Leicester
    - Connacht (Ireland) 26–22 Samoa in Galway

==== Volleyball ====
- Women's World Championship in Japan: (teams in **bold** advance to the semifinals)
  - Pool E in Tokyo:
    - Serbia 0–3 **Russia**
    - Peru 0–3 Turkey
    - Poland 0–3 China
    - **Japan** 3–0 South Korea
      - Standings (after 6 matches): Russia 12 points, Japan 11, Turkey, South Korea, Serbia 9, Poland, China 8, Peru 6.
  - Pool F in Nagoya:
    - Czech Republic 1–3 Cuba
    - **Brazil** 3–0 Germany
    - Italy 3–0 Thailand
    - Netherlands 0–3 United States
      - Standings (after 6 matches): Brazil 12 points, United States 11, Italy 10, Germany 9, Netherlands, Cuba 8, Czech Republic, Thailand 7.

=== November 8, 2010 (Monday) ===
==== American football ====
- NFL Monday Night Football, Week 9: Pittsburgh Steelers 27, Cincinnati Bengals 21
- The Dallas Cowboys fire head coach Wade Phillips and name Jason Garrett as interim replacement. (CBC)

==== Cricket ====
- Pakistan vs South Africa in UAE:
  - 5th ODI in Dubai: South Africa 317/5 (50 overs); Pakistan 260 (44.5 overs). **South Africa win by 57 runs; win the 5-match series 3–2.**
- New Zealand in India:
  - 1st Test in Ahmedabad, day 5: India 487 and 266 (102.4 overs; Harbhajan Singh 115, Chris Martin 5/63); New Zealand 459 and 22/1 (10 overs). **Match drawn; 3-match series level 0–0.**

==== Fencing ====
- World Championships in Paris, France:
  - Men's épée: (gold) Nikolai Novosjolov (EST) (silver) Gauthier Grumier (FRA) (bronze) Gábor Boczkó (HUN) and Jean-Michel Lucenay (FRA)
  - Women's épée: (gold) Maureen Nisima (FRA) (silver) Emese Szász (HUN) (bronze) Tatiana Logounova (RUS) and Nathalie Moellhausen (ITA)

==== Football (soccer) ====
- CONCACAF Women's Gold Cup in Cancún, Mexico:
  - 3rd place playoff: Costa Rica 0–3 (bronze) United States
    - The USA will play against Italy in the UEFA-CONCACAF play-off for a place in the 2011 FIFA Women's World Cup.
  - Final: (gold) Canada 1–0 (silver) Mexico
    - Canada win the title for the second time, and the first time with the USA also competing.
- African Women's Championship in South Africa: (teams in **bold** advance to the semifinals)
  - Group B:
    - Ghana 1–3 **Equatorial Guinea**
    - **Cameroon** 2–1 Algeria
      - Final standings: Equatorial Guinea, Cameroon 7 points, Ghana 3, Algeria 0.
- Sudamericano Femenino in Ecuador:
  - Group A:
    - Chile 3–0 Bolivia
    - Argentina 2–0 Peru
      - Standings: Argentina 9 points (3 matches), Chile 6 (3), Ecuador 3 (2), Peru, Bolivia 0 (2).

=== November 7, 2010 (Sunday) ===
==== American football ====
- NFL Week 9:
  - Atlanta Falcons 27, Tampa Bay Buccaneers 21
  - Bills Toronto Series: Chicago Bears 22, Buffalo Bills 19 in Toronto
  - Cleveland Browns 34, New England Patriots 14
  - New York Jets 23, Detroit Lions 20 (OT)
  - New Orleans Saints 34, Carolina Panthers 3
  - Baltimore Ravens 26, Miami Dolphins 10
  - San Diego Chargers 29, Houston Texans 23
  - Minnesota Vikings 27, Arizona Cardinals 24 (OT)
  - New York Giants 41, Seattle Seahawks 7
  - Philadelphia Eagles 26, Indianapolis Colts 24
  - Oakland Raiders 23, Kansas City Chiefs 20 (OT)
  - Sunday Night Football: Green Bay Packers 45, Dallas Cowboys 7
  - Byes: Denver Broncos, Jacksonville Jaguars, St. Louis Rams, San Francisco 49ers, Tennessee Titans, Washington Redskins

==== Athletics ====
- World Marathon Majors:
  - New York City Marathon:
    - Men: (gold) Gebregziabher Gebremariam (ETH) 2:08:14 (silver) Emmanuel Kipchirchir Mutai (KEN) 2:09:18 (bronze) Moses Kigen Kipkosgei (KEN) 2:10:39
      - After the race, Haile Gebrselassie announces his retirement, but he reverses his decision on November 15.
    - Women: (gold) Edna Kiplagat (KEN) 2:28:20 (silver) Shalane Flanagan (USA) 2:28:40 (bronze) Mary Jepkosgei Keitany (KEN) 2:29:01
  - 2009–10 series final standings:
    - Men: (1) Samuel Wanjiru (KEN) 75 points (2) Tsegaye Kebede (ETH) 65 (3) Mutai 50.
    - Women: (1) Liliya Shobukhova (RUS) 85 points (2) Irina Mikitenko (GER) 41 (3) Salina Kosgei (KEN) 36.

==== Auto racing ====
- Formula One:
  - Brazilian Grand Prix in São Paulo: (1) Sebastian Vettel (GER) (Red Bull–Renault) (2) Mark Webber (AUS) (Red Bull-Renault) (3) Fernando Alonso (ESP) (Ferrari)
    - Drivers' championship standings (after 18 of 19 races): (1) Alonso 246 points (2) Webber 238 (3) Vettel 231
    - Constructors' championship standings: (1) Red Bull 469 points (2) McLaren 421 (3) Ferrari 389
      - Red Bull win the constructors' championship for the first time.
- Chase for the Sprint Cup:
  - AAA Texas 500 in Fort Worth: (1) (Virginia) Denny Hamlin (Toyota; Joe Gibbs Racing) (2) (Wisconsin) Matt Kenseth (Ford; Roush Fenway Racing) (3) (Arkansas) Mark Martin (Chevrolet; Hendrick Motorsports)
    - Drivers' championship standings (after 34 of 36 races): (1) Hamlin 6325 points (2) (California) Jimmie Johnson (Chevrolet; Hendrick Motorsports) 6292 (3) (California) Kevin Harvick (Chevrolet; Richard Childress Racing) 6266

==== Badminton ====
- BWF Super Series:
  - French Super Series in Paris
    - Men's singles: **Taufik Hidayat** (INA) def. Joachim Persson (DEN) 21–16, 21–11
    - Women's singles: **Wang Yihan** (CHN) def. Li Xuerui (CHN) 21–13, 21–9
    - Men's doubles: **Mathias Boe** (DEN)/**Carsten Mogensen** (DEN) def. Ingo Kindervater (GER)/Johannes Schöttler (GER) 21–15, 21–9
    - Women's doubles: **Duanganong Aroonkesorn** (THA)/**Kunchala Voravichitchaikul** (THA) def. Petya Nedelcheva (BUL)/Anastasia Russkikh (RUS) 21–16, 11–2
    - Mixed doubles: **Sudket Prapakamol** (THA)/**Saralee Thungthongkam** (THA) def. Michael Fuchs (GER)/Birgit Overzier (GER) 21–15, 21–15

==== Baseball ====
- Japan Series:
  - Game 7, Chiba Lotte Marines 8, Chunichi Dragons 7. **Marines win series 4–2–1.**
    - The Marines win the Series for the fourth time in franchise history and the second time with the current name.

==== Cricket ====
- Sri Lanka in Australia:
  - 3rd ODI in Brisbane: Sri Lanka 115 (32 overs; Clint McKay 5/33); Australia 119/2 (21.4 overs). **Australia win by 8 wickets; Sri Lanka win 3-match series 2–1.**
- New Zealand in India:
  - 1st Test in Ahmedabad, day 4: India 487 and 82/6 (40 overs; Chris Martin 5/25); New Zealand 459 (165.4 overs; Kane Williamson 131). India lead by 110 runs with 4 wickets remaining.

==== Cycling ====
- European Track Championships in Pruszków, Poland:
  - Men's:
    - Madison: (gold) Czech Republic (silver) Belgium (bronze) Ukraine
    - Keirin: (gold) Jason Kenny (GBR) (silver) Matthew Crampton (GBR) (bronze) Adam Ptáčník (CZE)
    - Omnium: (gold) Roger Kluge (GER) (silver) Tim Veldt (NED) (bronze) Rafał Ratajczyk (POL)
  - Women's:
    - Keirin: (gold) Olga Panarina (BLR) (silver) Simona Krupeckaitė (LTU) (bronze) Lyubov Shulika (UKR)
    - Omnium: (gold) Leire Dorronsoro (ESP) (silver) Tatsiana Sharakova (BLR) (bronze) Małgorzata Wojtyra (POL)

==== Equestrianism ====
- Show jumping:
  - FEI World Cup Western European League:
    - 4th competition in Verona (CSI 5*-W): (gold) Jeroen Dubbeldam (NED) on Simon (silver) Meredith Michaels-Beerbaum (GER) on Shutterfly (bronze) Rolf-Göran Bengtsson (SWE) on Casall
      - Standings (after 4 of 13 competitions): (1) Kevin Staut (FRA) 43 points (2) Christian Ahlmann (GER) 40 (3) Michaels-Beerbaum 37
    - 6th competition in Munich (CSI 4*): (gold) Marcus Ehning (GER) on Sandro Boy (silver) Mario Stevens on D'Avignon (bronze) Denis Lynch (IRL) on Abbervail van het Dingeshof
      - Final standings: (1) Lynch 60 points (2) Ehning 57 (3) Heiko Schmidt (GER) 41
- Eventing:
  - HSBC FEI Classics:
    - 5th competition – Étoiles de Pau (CCI 4*): (gold) Andreas Dibowski (GER) on FRH Fantasia (silver) William Fox-Pitt (GBR) on Navigator (bronze) Karin Donckers (BEL) on Charizard
      - Final standings: (1) Fox-Pitt 39 points (2) Dibowski 37 (3) Caroline Powell (NZL) 21

==== Fencing ====
- World Championships in Paris, France:
  - Men's foil: (gold) Peter Joppich (GER) (silver) Lei Sheng (CHN) (bronze) Gerek Meinhardt (USA) and Yuki Ota (JPN)
  - Women's foil: (gold) Elisa Di Francisca (ITA) (silver) Arianna Errigo (ITA) (bronze) Nam Hyun-Hee (KOR) and Valentina Vezzali (ITA)

==== Football (soccer) ====
- African Women's Championship in South Africa: (teams in **bold** advance to the semifinals)
  - Group A:
    - Mali 0–4 **South Africa**
    - Tanzania 0–3 **Nigeria**
    - Final standings: Nigeria 9 points, South Africa 6, Mali 3, Tanzania 0.
- Sudamericano Femenino in Ecuador:
  - Group B:
    - Venezuela 0–4 Paraguay
    - Uruguay 0–4 Brazil
      - Standings: Brazil 6 points (2 matches), Colombia 3 (1), Paraguay 3 (2), Uruguay 0 (1), Venezuela 0 (2).
- (United States) (Canada) MLS Cup Playoffs:
  - Western Conference Semifinal, second leg in Carson, California (first leg score in parentheses):
    - **Los Angeles Galaxy** 2–1 (1–0) Seattle Sounders FC. Galaxy win 3–1 on aggregate.
- (Sweden) Allsvenskan, final matchday: (team in **bold** qualify for the Champions League, teams in italics qualify for the Europa League)
  - **Malmö FF** 2–0 Mjällby AIF
  - Helsingborgs IF 0–0 Kalmar FF
    - Final standings: Malmö FF 67 points, Helsingborgs IF 65, Örebro SK 52, IF Elfsborg 47.
    - Malmö win the title for the 16th time after 6 years break.

==== Golf ====
- World Golf Championships:
  - WGC-HSBC Champions in Shanghai, China:
    - Winner: Francesco Molinari (ITA) 269 (−19)
      - Molinari wins his second European Tour title.
- LPGA Tour:
  - Mizuno Classic in Shima, Mie, Japan:
    - Winner: Jiyai Shin (KOR) 198 (−18)
      - Shin wins her second LPGA title of the season and the eighth of her career.
- Champions Tour:
  - Charles Schwab Cup Championship in San Francisco:
    - Winner: John Cook (USA) 267 (−17)
      - Cook repeats his 2009 victory and wins his fifth Champions Tour title.
      - Bernhard Langer (DEU) wins the Charles Schwab Cup points race for the first time, and wins a third consecutive season money title.

==== Motorcycle racing ====
- Moto GP:
  - Valencian Grand Prix in Valencia, Spain:
    - MotoGP: (1) Jorge Lorenzo (ESP) (Yamaha) (2) Casey Stoner (AUS) (Ducati) (3) Valentino Rossi (ITA) (Yamaha)
      - Final riders' championship standings: (1) Lorenzo 383 points (2) Dani Pedrosa (ESP) (Honda) 245 (3) Rossi 233
      - Final manufacturers' championship standings: (1) Yamaha 404 points (2) Honda 342 (3) Ducati 286
    - Moto2: (1) Karel Abraham (CZE) (FTR) (2) Andrea Iannone (ITA) (Speed Up) (3) Julián Simón (ESP) (Suter)
      - Final riders' championship standings: (1) Toni Elías (ESP) (Moriwaki) 271 points (2) Simón 201 (3) Iannone 199
      - Final manufacturers' championship standings: (1) Suter 322 points (2) Moriwaki 309 (3) Speed Up 232
    - 125cc: (1) Bradley Smith (GBR) (Aprilia) (2) Pol Espargaró (ESP) (Derbi) (3) Nicolás Terol (ESP) (Aprilia)
      - Final riders' championship standings: (1) Marc Márquez (ESP) (Derbi) 310 points (2) Terol 296 (3) Espargaró 281
        - Márquez seals his first championship title.
      - Manufacturers' championship standings: (1) Derbi 405 points (2) Aprilia 348 (3) Honda 27

==== Rowing ====
- World Championships in Cambridge, New Zealand:
  - LW1x: (gold) Germany 7:43.45 (silver) New Zealand 7:48.48 (bronze) Italy 7:49.04
  - LM1x: (gold) Italy 7:05.82 (silver) Slovakia 7:08.19 (bronze) Hungary 7:09.86
  - W2x: (gold) Great Britain 7:04.70 (silver) Australia 7:10.08 (bronze) Poland 7:14.40
  - M2x: (gold) New Zealand 6:22.63 (silver) Great Britain 6:24.21 (bronze) France 6:28.54
  - LM8+: (gold) Germany 5:48.61 (silver) Australia 5:50.27 (bronze) Italy 5:52.24
  - W8+: (gold) United States 6:12.42 (silver) Canada 6:16.12 (bronze) Romania 6:18.96
  - M8+: (gold) Germany 5:33.84 (silver) Great Britain 5:34.46 (bronze) Australia 5:35.96

==== Snooker ====
- World Seniors Championship in Bradford, England:
  - Semi-final: John Parrott (ENG) 2–3 **Jimmy White** (ENG)
  - Final: Steve Davis (ENG) 1–4 **White**

==== Tennis ====
- Fed Cup Final in San Diego, day 2: United States 1–3 **Italy**
  - Melanie Oudin (USA) def. Francesca Schiavone (ITA) 6–3, 6–1
  - Flavia Pennetta (ITA) def. CoCo Vandeweghe (USA) 6–1, 6–2
    - Italy repeat their 2009 victory over the United States, and win their third Fed Cup.
- ATP World Tour:
  - Valencia Open 500 in Valencia, Spain:
    - Final: **David Ferrer** (ESP) def. Marcel Granollers (ESP) 7–5, 6–3
      - Ferrer wins the ninth title of his career.
  - Davidoff Swiss Indoors in Basel, Switzerland:
    - Final: **Roger Federer** (SUI) def. Novak Djokovic (SRB) 6–4, 3–6, 6–1
      - Federer wins his fourth title of the year and the 65th of his career.
- WTA Tour:
  - Commonwealth Bank Tournament of Champions in Bali, Indonesia:
    - Final: **Ana Ivanovic** (SRB) def. Alisa Kleybanova (RUS) 6–2, 7–6(5)
      - Ivanovic wins her second title of the year and the tenth of her career.

==== Volleyball ====
- Women's World Championship in Japan:
  - Pool E in Tokyo:
    - Peru 1–3 South Korea
    - Serbia 3–1 China
    - Poland 0–3 Russia
    - Japan 3–1 Turkey
      - Standings (after 5 matches): Russia 10 points, Japan 9, South Korea, Serbia 8, Poland, Turkey 7, China 6, Peru 5.
  - Pool F in Nagoya:
    - Netherlands 1–3 Thailand
    - Czech Republic 0–3 Germany
    - Brazil 3–1 Cuba
    - Italy 3–1 United States
      - Standings (after 5 matches): Brazil 10 points, United States 9, Germany, Italy 8, Netherlands 7, Cuba, Czech Republic, Thailand 6.

=== November 6, 2010 (Saturday) ===
==== American football ====
- NCAA (unbeaten teams in **bold**):
  - BCS Top 10:
    - (1) **Oregon** 53, Washington 16
    - (2) **Auburn** 62, Chattanooga 24
    - (3) **TCU** 47, (5) Utah 7
    - (4) **Boise State** 42, Hawaiʻi 7
    - (10) LSU 24, (6) Alabama 21
    - (7) Nebraska 31, Iowa State 30 (OT)
    - Texas A&M 33, (8) Oklahoma 19
    - (9) Wisconsin 34, Purdue 13
  - Other games:
    - Texas Tech 24, (12) Missouri 17
    - (13) Stanford 42, (15) Arizona 17
    - (17) Oklahoma State 55, (21) Baylor 28
    - (18) Arkansas 41, (19) South Carolina 20
    - North Carolina 37, (24) Florida State 35
    - Clemson 14, (25) North Carolina State 13

==== Auto racing ====
- Nationwide Series:
  - O'Reilly Challenge in Fort Worth: (1) (Missouri) Carl Edwards (Ford; Roush Fenway Racing) (2) (Nevada) Kyle Busch (Toyota; Joe Gibbs Racing) (3) (Michigan) Brad Keselowski (Dodge; Penske Racing)
    - Drivers' championship standings (after 33 of 35 races): (1) Keselowski 5314 points (2) Edwards 4849 (3) Busch 4619
    - Keselowski clinches his first series championship.

==== Baseball ====
- Japan Series:
  - Game 6, Chiba Lotte Marines 2, Chunichi Dragons 2 (15 innings). Marines lead series 3–2–1.

==== Cricket ====
- New Zealand in India:
  - 1st Test in Ahmedabad, day 3: India 487; New Zealand 331/5 (117.3 overs; Jesse Ryder 103). New Zealand trail by 156 runs with 5 wickets remaining in the 1st innings.

==== Cycling ====
- European Track Championships in Pruszków, Poland:
  - Men's Sprint: (gold) Denis Dmitriev (RUS) (silver) Kévin Sireau (FRA) (bronze) Jason Kenny (GBR)
  - Women's Sprint: (gold) Sandie Clair (FRA) (silver) Kristina Vogel (GER) (bronze) Simona Krupeckaitė (LTU)

==== Fencing ====
- World Championships in Paris, France:
  - Men's sabre: (gold) Won Woo-Young (KOR) (silver) Nicolas Limbach (GER) (bronze) Cosmin Hănceanu (ROU) and Veniamin Reshetnikov (RUS)
  - Women's sabre: (gold) Mariel Zagunis (USA) (silver) Olha Kharlan (UKR) (bronze) Olena Khomrova (UKR) and Sophia Velikaia (RUS)

==== Figure skating ====
- ISU Grand Prix:
  - Cup of China in Beijing, China: (skaters in **bold** qualify for the Final)
    - Ice Dance: (gold) Nathalie Péchalat / Fabian Bourzat (FRA) 159.59 (silver) Ekaterina Bobrova / Dmitri Soloviev (RUS) 145.39 (bronze) Federica Faiella / Massimo Scali (ITA) 139.52
      - Standings (after 3 of 6 events): Meryl Davis / Charlie White (USA), Péchalat / Bourzat, Vanessa Crone / Paul Poirier (CAN) 15 points (1 event), Sinead Kerr / John Kerr (GBR), Bobrova / Soloviev, Kaitlyn Weaver / Andrew Poje (CAN) 13 (1), Faiella / Scali, Madison Chock / Greg Zuerlein (USA), Maia Shibutani / Alex Shibutani (USA) 11 (1).
    - Ladies: (gold) Miki Ando (JPN) 172.21 (silver) Akiko Suzuki (JPN) 162.86 (bronze) Alena Leonova (RUS) 148.61
      - Standings (after 3 of 6 events): Alissa Czisny (USA), Ando, Carolina Kostner (ITA) 15 points (1 event), Ksenia Makarova (RUS), Suzuki, Rachael Flatt (USA) 13 (1), Amélie Lacoste (CAN), Kanako Murakami (JPN), Leonova 11 (1).
    - Men: (gold) Takahiko Kozuka (JPN) 233.51 (silver) Brandon Mroz (USA) 216.80 (bronze) Tomáš Verner (CZE) 214.81
      - Standings (after 3 of 6 events): Patrick Chan (CAN), Daisuke Takahashi (JPN), Kozuka 15 points (1 event), Nobunari Oda (JPN), Jeremy Abbott (USA), Mroz 13 (1), Adam Rippon (USA), Verner, Florent Amodio (FRA) 11 (1).
    - Pairs: (gold) **Pang Qing / Tong Jian** (CHN) 177.50 (silver) Sui Wenjing / Han Cong (CHN) 171.47 (bronze) Caitlin Yankowskas / John Coughlin (USA) 166.72
      - Standings (after 3 of 6 events): Pang / Tong 30 points (2 events), Lubov Iliushechkina / Nodari Maisuradze (RUS) 24 (2), Yankowskas / Coughlin 20 (2), Vera Bazarova / Yuri Larionov (RUS), Sui / Han, Kirsten Moore-Towes / Dylan Moscovitch (CAN) 13 (1), Paige Lawrence / Rudi Swiegers (CAN), Narumi Takahashi / Mervin Tran (JPN) 11 (1).

==== Football (soccer) ====
- Sudamericano Femenino in Ecuador:
  - Group A:
    - Chile 1–2 Argentina
    - Ecuador 2–1 Peru
      - Standings: Argentina 6 points (2 matches), Chile, Ecuador 3 (2), Peru, Bolivia 0 (1).
- Caribbean Championship Qualifying Group Stage Two:
  - Group F in Marabella, Trinidad and Tobago: (teams in **bold** qualify for the Final Tournament)
    - **Guyana** 2–0 Saint Vincent
    - **Trinidad and Tobago** 4–0 Haiti
      - Final standings: Trinidad and Tobago 9 points, Guyana, Haiti 4, Saint Vincent 0.
- AFC Cup Final, in Kuwait City:
  - Al-Qadsia (Kuwait) 1–1 (2–4 pen.) (Syria) **Al-Ittihad**
    - Al-Ittihad win the Cup for the first time.
- (United States) (Canada) MLS Cup Playoffs:
  - Conference semifinals (first leg scores in parentheses):
    - Eastern Conference, second leg in Columbus, Ohio:
      - Columbus Crew 2–1 (0–1) **Colorado Rapids**. 2–2 on aggregate; Rapids win 5–4 on penalties.
    - Western Conference, second leg in Sandy, Utah:
      - Real Salt Lake 1–1 (1–2) **FC Dallas**. Dallas win 3–2 on aggregate.

==== Horse racing ====
- Breeders' Cup in Louisville, Kentucky
  - Sprint: (gold) Big Drama (trainer: David Fawkes; jockey: Eibar Coa) (silver) Hamazing Destiny (trainer: D. Wayne Lukas; jockey: Joel Rosario) (bronze) Smiling Tiger (trainer: Jeffrey L. Bonde; jockey: Russell Baze)
  - Turf Sprint: (gold) Chamberlain Bridge (trainer: W. Bret Calhoun; jockey: Jamie Theriot) (silver) Central City (trainer: Ronny W. Werner; jockey: Robby Albarado) (bronze) Unzip Me (trainer: Martin F. Jones; jockey: Rafael Bejarano)
  - Juvenile: (gold) Uncle Mo (trainer: Todd Pletcher; jockey: John R. Velazquez) (silver) Boys At Tosconova (trainer: Richard E. Dutrow Jr.; jockey: Ramon A. Dominguez) (bronze) Rogue Romance (trainer: Kenneth McPeek; jockey: Julien Leparoux)
  - Mile: (gold) Goldikova (trainer: Freddy Head; jockey: Olivier Peslier) (silver) Gio Ponti (trainer: Christophe Clement; jockey: Ramon A. Dominguez) (bronze) The Usual Q. T. (trainer: Jim Cassidy; jockey: Victor Espinoza)
    - Goldikova becomes the first horse to win at three successive Breeders' Cups.
  - Dirt Mile: (gold) Dakota Phone (trainer: Jerry Hollendorfer; jockey: Joel Rosario) (silver) Morning Line (trainer: Nick Zito; jockey: Javier Castellano) (bronze) Gayego (trainer: Saeed bin Suroor; jockey: Frankie Dettori)
  - Turf: (gold) Dangerous Midge (trainer: Brian Meehan; jockey: Frankie Dettori) (silver) Champ Pegasus (trainer: Richard E. Mandella; jockey: Joel Rosario) (bronze) Behkabad (trainer: Jean-Claude Rouget; jockey: Christophe Lemaire)
  - Classic: (gold) Blame (trainer: Albert Stall Jr.; jockey: Garrett K. Gomez) (silver) Zenyatta (trainer: John Shirreffs; jockey: Mike E. Smith) (bronze) Fly Down (trainer: Nick Zito; jockey: Julien Leparoux)
    - Zenyatta ends her career with a record of 19–1.

==== Rowing ====
- World Championships in Cambridge, New Zealand:
  - LM4-: (gold) Great Britain 6:10.71 (silver) Australia 6:10.78 (bronze) China 6:10.79
  - M2-: (gold) New Zealand 6:30.16 (silver) Great Britain 6:30.48 (bronze) Greece 6:36.00
  - W1x: (gold) Sweden 7:47.61 (silver) Belarus 7:47.79 (bronze) New Zealand 7:49.64
  - M1x: (gold) Czech Republic 6:47.49 (silver) New Zealand 6:49.42 (bronze) Great Britain 6:49.83
  - W2-: (gold) New Zealand 7:17.12 (silver) Great Britain 7:20.24 (bronze) United States 7:22.46
  - M2+: (gold) Australia 7:03.32 (silver) Italy 7:04.38 (bronze) Germany 7:06.20
  - LW4x: (gold) Germany 6:44.94 (silver) United States 6:47.99 (bronze) China 6:49.50
  - LM4x: (gold) Germany 6:11.44 (silver) France 6:14.02 (bronze) Denmark 6:14.94

==== Rugby league ====
- Four Nations: (teams in **bold** advance to the final)
  - Round three in Auckland:
    - England 36–10 Papua New Guinea
    - **New Zealand** 20–34 **Australia**
      - Final standings: Australia 6 points, New Zealand 4, England 2, Papua New Guinea 0.

==== Rugby union ====
- End of year tests:
  - Week 3:
    - Japan 75–3 Russia in Tokyo
    - Belgium 12–43 Canada in Brussels
    - England 16–26 New Zealand in London
    - Wales 16–25 Australia in Cardiff
    - Ireland 21–23 South Africa in Dublin

==== Snooker ====
- World Seniors Championship in Bradford, England:
  - Quarter-finals:
    - Ken Doherty (IRL) 0–2 **Nigel Bond** (ENG)
    - **Steve Davis** (ENG) 2–0 Joe Johnson (ENG)
    - Dennis Taylor (NIR) 0–2 **John Parrott** (ENG)
    - **Jimmy White** (ENG) 2–0 Cliff Thorburn (CAN)
  - Semi-final: **Davis** 3–1 Bond

==== Tennis ====
- Fed Cup Final in San Diego, day 1: United States 0–2 Italy
  - Francesca Schiavone (ITA) def. CoCo Vandeweghe (USA) 6–2, 6–4
  - Flavia Pennetta (ITA) def. Bethanie Mattek-Sands (USA) 7–6(4), 6–2

==== Volleyball ====
- Women's World Championship in Japan:
  - Pool E in Tokyo:
    - Serbia 0–3 Turkey
    - Peru 0–3 Russia
    - Poland 3–2 South Korea
    - Japan 1–3 China
      - Standings (after 4 matches): Russia 8 points, Japan 7, Poland, Turkey, South Korea, Serbia 6, China 5, Peru 4.
  - Pool F in Nagoya:
    - Netherlands 3–1 Cuba
    - Czech Republic 0–3 United States
    - Brazil 3–0 Thailand
    - Italy 3–1 Germany
      - Standings (after 4 matches): Brazil, United States 8 points, Netherlands, Germany, Italy 6, Cuba, Czech Republic 5, Thailand 4.

=== November 5, 2010 (Friday) ===
==== Cricket ====
- Pakistan vs South Africa in UAE:
  - 4th ODI in Dubai: South Africa 274/6 (50 overs); Pakistan 275/9 (49.5 overs). **Pakistan win by 1 wicket; 5-match series level 2–2.**
- Sri Lanka in Australia:
  - 2nd ODI in Sydney: Sri Lanka 213/3 (41.1/45 overs); Australia 210 (37.4/38 overs). **Sri Lanka win by 29 runs (D/L); lead 3-match series 2–0.**
- New Zealand in India:
  - 1st Test in Ahmedabad, day 2: India 487 (151.5 overs); New Zealand 69/2 (28 overs). New Zealand trail by 418 runs with 8 wickets remaining in the 1st innings.

==== Cycling ====
- European Track Championships in Pruszków, Poland:
  - Men's:
    - Team pursuit: (gold) Great Britain 4:00.482 (silver) Russia 4:04.274 (bronze) Netherlands 4:06.049
    - Team sprint: (gold) Germany 44.066 (silver) France 44.281 (bronze) Great Britain 43.968
  - Women's:
    - Team pursuit: (gold) Great Britain 3:23.435 (silver) Lithuania 3.29.992 (bronze) Germany 3:28.127
    - Team sprint: (gold) France 33.478 (silver) Great Britain 33.586 (bronze) Germany 33.708

==== Figure skating ====
- ISU Grand Prix:
  - Cup of China in Beijing, China:
    - Ice Dance Short Dance: (1) Nathalie Péchalat / Fabian Bourzat (FRA) 64.12 (2) Federica Faiella / Massimo Scali (ITA) 57.21 (3) Ekaterina Bobrova / Dmitri Soloviev (RUS) 55.85
    - Ladies' Short Program: (1) Mirai Nagasu (USA) 58.76 (2) Akiko Suzuki (JPN) 57.97 (3) Miki Ando (JPN) 56.11
    - Men's Short Program: (1) Takahiko Kozuka (JPN) 77.40 (2) Brian Joubert (FRA) 74.80 (3) Tomáš Verner (CZE) 70.31
    - Pairs' Short Program: (1) Pang Qing / Tong Jian (CHN) 60.62 (2) Sui Wenjing / Han Cong (CHN) 59.58 (3) Caitlin Yankowskas / John Coughlin (USA) 57.86

==== Football (soccer) ====
- CONCACAF Women's Gold Cup in Cancún, Mexico:
  - Semifinals (**winners** qualify directly for the 2011 FIFA Women's World Cup):
    - **Canada** 4–0 Costa Rica
    - United States 1–2 **Mexico**
      - The USA suffer their first ever loss in this competition, and also their first ever loss to Mexico.
- African Women's Championship in South Africa:
  - Group B:
    - Equatorial Guinea 1–0 Algeria
    - Ghana 1–2 Cameroon
      - Standings (after 2 matches): Cameroon, Equatorial Guinea 4 points, Ghana 3, Algeria 0.
- Sudamericano Femenino in Ecuador:
  - Group B:
    - Paraguay 0–3 Colombia
    - Brazil 4–0 Venezuela

==== Horse racing ====
- Breeders' Cup in Louisville, Kentucky:
  - Marathon: (gold) Eldaafer (trainer: Diane Alvarado; jockey: John R. Velazquez) (silver) Gabriel's Hill (trainer: Seth Benzel; jockey: Julien Leparoux) (bronze) A. U. Miner (trainer: Clark Hanna; jockey: Calvin Borel)
  - Juvenile Fillies Turf: (gold) More Than Real (trainer: Todd Pletcher; jockey: Garrett K. Gomez) (silver) Winter Memories (trainer: James J. Toner; jockey: Jose Lezcano) (bronze) Kathmanblu (trainer: Kenneth McPeek; jockey: Julien Leparoux)
  - Filly & Mare Sprint: (gold) Dubai Majesty (trainer: W. Bret Calhoun; jockey: Jamie Theriot) (silver) Switch (trainer: John W. Sadler; jockey: Joel Rosario) (bronze) Evening Jewel (trainer: James Cassidy; jockey: Victor Espinoza)
  - Juvenile Fillies: (gold) Awesome Feather (trainer: Stanley I. Gold; jockey: Jeffrey Sanchez) (silver) R Heat Lightning (trainer: Todd Pletcher; jockey: John R. Velazquez) (bronze) Delightful Mary (trainer: Mark Casse; jockey: Shaun Bridgmohan)
  - Filly & Mare Turf: (gold) Shared Account (trainer: H. Graham Motion; jockey: Edgar Prado) (silver) Midday (trainer: Henry Cecil; jockey: Tom Queally) (bronze) Keertana (trainer: Thomas F. Proctor; jockey: Jose Lezcano)
  - Ladies' Classic: (gold) Unrivaled Belle (trainer: William I. Mott; jockey: Kent Desormeaux) (silver) Blind Luck (trainer: Jerry Hollendorfer; jockey: Joel Rosario) (bronze) Havre De Grace (trainer: Anthony W. Dutrow; jockey: Jeremy Rose)

==== Rowing ====
- World Championships in Cambridge, New Zealand:
  - LM2-: (gold) France 7:18.92 (silver) New Zealand 7:21.29 (bronze) Canada 7:23.79
  - LW2x: (gold) Canada 8:06.20 (silver) Germany 8:07.33 (bronze) Greece 8:09.14
  - LM2x: (gold) Great Britain 7:13.47 (silver) Italy 7:15.88 (bronze) New Zealand 7:18.31
  - M4-: (gold) France 6:45.38 (silver) Greece 6:47.15 (bronze) New Zealand 6:48.38
  - W4x: (gold) Great Britain 7:12.78 (silver) Ukraine 7:14.95 (bronze) Germany 7:15.26
  - M4x: (gold) Croatia 6:15.78 (silver) Italy 6:17.04 (bronze) Australia 6:18.93
  - W4-: (gold) Netherlands 7:21.09 (silver) Australia 7:23.99 (bronze) United States 7:24.56

==== Rugby union ====
- (New Zealand) ITM Cup Final in Christchurch:
  - **Canterbury** 33–13 Waikato
    - Canterbury win their third consecutive title.

==== Snooker ====
- World Seniors Championship in Bradford, England:
  - Pre-qualifying: Peter Ebdon (ENG) 0–2 **Nigel Bond** (ENG)

=== November 4, 2010 (Thursday) ===
==== Baseball ====
- Japan Series:
  - Game 5, Chiba Lotte Marines 10, Chunichi Dragons 4. Marines lead series 3–2.

==== Basketball ====
- Euroleague:
  - Regular Season, matchday 3 (unbeaten teams in **bold**):
    - Group A: Partizan Belgrade (Serbia) 54–67 (Israel) Maccabi Tel Aviv
    - Group B: Virtus Roma (Italy) 56–74 (Spain) Real Madrid
    - Group C:
      - Cholet Basket (France) 73–69 (Lithuania) Lietuvos Rytas
      - Regal FC Barcelona (Spain) 61–69 (Turkey) **Fenerbahçe Ülker**
    - Group D: **Union Olimpija Ljubljana** (Slovenia) 85–84 (OT) (Greece) Panathinaikos Athens

==== Cricket ====
- New Zealand in India:
  - 1st Test in Ahmedabad, day 1: India 329/3 (90 overs; Virender Sehwag 173, Rahul Dravid 104); New Zealand.

==== Football (soccer) ====
- African Women's Championship in South Africa:
  - Group A: (team in **bold** advance to the semi-finals)
    - South Africa 1–2 **Nigeria**
    - Mali 3–2 Tanzania
      - Standings (after 2 matches): Nigeria 6 points, South Africa, Mali 3, Tanzania 0.
- Sudamericano Femenino in Ecuador:
  - Group A:
    - Argentina 3–0 Bolivia
    - Ecuador 1–2 Chile
- Caribbean Championship Qualifying Group Stage Two:
  - Group F in Marabella, Trinidad and Tobago: (team in **bold** qualify for the Final Tournament)
    - Saint Vincent 1–3 Haiti
    - **Trinidad and Tobago** 2–1 Guyana
      - Standings (after 2 matches): Trinidad and Tobago 6 points, Haiti 4, Guyana 1, Saint Vincent 0.
- UEFA Europa League group stage, matchday 4: (teams in **bold** advance to the knockout stages)
  - Group A:
    - Lech Poznań (Poland) 3–1 (England) Manchester City
    - Juventus (Italy) 0–0 (Austria) Red Bull Salzburg
      - Standings (after 4 matches): Lech Poznań, Manchester City 7 points, Juventus 4, Red Bull Salzburg 2.
  - Group B:
    - Rosenborg (Norway) 1–2 (Spain) Atlético Madrid
    - Bayer Leverkusen (Germany) 1–0 (Greece) Aris
      - Standings (after 4 matches): Bayer Leverkusen 8 points, Atlético Madrid 7, Aris 4, Rosenborg 3.
  - Group C:
    - Gent (Belgium) 3–1 (Portugal) Sporting CP
    - Levski Sofia (Bulgaria) 2–2 (France) Lille
      - Standings (after 4 matches): Sporting CP 9 points, Lille 5, Levski Sofia, Gent 4.
  - Group D:
    - PAOK (Greece) 1–0 (Spain) Villarreal
    - Club Brugge (Belgium) 0–2 (Croatia) Dinamo Zagreb
      - Standings (after 4 matches): PAOK, Dinamo Zagreb 7 points, Villarreal 6, Club Brugge 2.
  - Group E:
    - **BATE** (Belarus) 3–1 (Moldova) Sheriff Tiraspol
    - Dynamo Kyiv (Ukraine) 2–0 (Netherlands) AZ
      - Standings (after 4 matches): BATE 10 points, Dynamo Kyiv 7, Arizona, Sheriff Tiraspol 3.
  - Group F:
    - **CSKA Moscow** (Russia) 3–1 (Italy) Palermo
    - Lausanne-Sport (Switzerland) 1–3 (Czech Republic) Sparta Prague
      - Standings (after 4 matches): CSKA Moscow 12 points, Sparta Prague 7, Palermo 3, Lausanne-Sport 1.
  - Group G:
    - Hajduk Split (Croatia) 2–3 (Russia) **Zenit St. Petersburg**
    - AEK Athens (Greece) 1–1 (Belgium) Anderlecht
      - Standings (after 4 matches): Zenit St. Petersburg 12 points, Anderlecht, AEK Athens 4, Hajduk Split 3.
  - Group H:
    - Odense (Denmark) 2–0 (Switzerland) Young Boys
    - Getafe (Spain) 0–3 (Germany) **Stuttgart**
      - Standings (after 4 matches): Stuttgart 12 points, Young Boys 6, Getafe, Odense 3.
  - Group I:
    - Sampdoria (Italy) 0–0 (Ukraine) Metalist Kharkiv
    - PSV Eindhoven (Netherlands) 3–0 (Hungary) Debrecen
      - Standings (after 4 matches): PSV Eindhoven 10 points, Metalist Kharkiv 7, Sampdoria 5, Debrecen 0.
  - Group J:
    - Paris Saint-Germain (France) 0–0 (Germany) Borussia Dortmund
    - Sevilla (Spain) 4–0 (Ukraine) Karpaty Lviv
      - Standings (after 4 matches): Sevilla 9 points, Paris Saint-Germain 8, Borussia Dortmund 5, Karpaty Lviv 0.
  - Group K:
    - Steaua București (Romania) 3–1 (Netherlands) Utrecht
    - Liverpool (England) 3–1 (Italy) Napoli
      - Standings (after 4 matches): Liverpool 8 points, Steaua București 5, Napoli, Utrecht 3.
  - Group L:
    - Rapid Wien (Austria) 1–2 (Bulgaria) CSKA Sofia
    - **Porto** (Portugal) 1–1 (Turkey) Beşiktaş
      - Standings (after 4 matches): Porto 10 points, Beşiktaş 7, Rapid Wien, CSKA Sofia 3.
- (United States) (Canada) MLS Cup Playoffs:
  - Eastern Conference Semifinal, second leg in Harrison, New Jersey (first leg score in parentheses):
    - New York Red Bulls 1–3 (1–0) **San Jose Earthquakes**. Earthquakes win 3–2 on aggregate.

==== Rowing ====
- World Championships in Cambridge, New Zealand:
  - ASW1x: (gold) France 6:43.18 (silver) Brazil 6:47.60 (bronze) Portugal 7:37.46
  - ASM1x: (gold) Great Britain 5:19.36 (silver) Ukraine 5:32.67 (bronze) New Zealand 5:33.39
  - TAMix2x: (gold) Ukraine 4:24.71 (silver) France 4:28.05 (bronze) Australia 4:28.16
  - IDMix4+: (gold) Hong Kong 4:09.58 (silver) Italy 4:30.37 (bronze) Russia 5:00.28
  - LTAMix4+: (gold) Canada 3:36.53 (silver) Great Britain 3:37.08 (bronze) Germany 3:39.65

==== Snooker ====
- Premier League week 8 in Weston-super-Mare: (player in **bold** advances to the semi-finals, player in ~~strike~~ is eliminated)
  - **Marco Fu** (HKG) 4–2 Neil Robertson (AUS)
  - Shaun Murphy (ENG) 3–3 Mark Selby (ENG)
    - Standings: Fu 8 points (6 matches), Selby, Mark Williams (WAL) 5 (5), Ronnie O'Sullivan (ENG) 5 (4), Murphy 4 (4), ~~Ding Junhui~~ (CHN) 4 (6), Robertson 3 (4).

==== Snowboarding ====
- World Cup in Saas-Fee, Switzerland:
  - Men's halfpipe: (gold) Tore Viken Holvik (NOR) (silver) Ryō Aono (JPN) (bronze) Mathieu Crépel (FRA)
  - Women's halfpipe: (gold) Cai Xuetong (CHN) (silver) Sun Zhifeng (CHN) (bronze) Ursina Haller (SUI)

=== November 3, 2010 (Wednesday) ===
==== Baseball ====
- Japan Series:
  - Game 4, Chunichi Dragons 4, Chiba Lotte Marines 3 (11 innings). Series tied 2–2.

==== Basketball ====
- Euroleague:
  - Regular Season, matchday 3 (unbeaten teams in **bold**):
    - Group A:
      - Khimki Moscow (Russia) 64–60 (Spain) Caja Laboral
      - Žalgiris Kaunas (Lithuania) 74–68 (OT) (Poland) Asseco Prokom Gdynia
    - Group B:
      - Olympiacos Piraeus (Greece) 93–66 (Spain) Unicaja Málaga
      - Brose Baskets (Germany) 79–69 (Belgium) Spirou Basket
    - Group C: **Montepaschi Siena** (Italy) 80–57 (Croatia) KK Cibona Zagreb
    - Group D:
      - Efes Pilsen Istanbul (Turkey) 82–74 (Italy) Armani Jeans Milano
      - Power Electronics Valencia (Spain) 82–57 (Russia) CSKA Moscow

==== Cricket ====
- Sri Lanka in Australia:
  - 1st ODI in Melbourne: Australia 239/8 (50 overs; Thisara Perera 5/46); Sri Lanka 243/9 (44.2 overs). **Sri Lanka win by 1 wicket; lead 3-match series 1–0.**
    - Angelo Mathews and Lasith Malinga set a One Day International record stand of 132 runs for the ninth wicket.

==== Football (soccer) ====
- UEFA Champions League group stage, matchday 4: (teams in **bold** advance to the knockout stage)
  - Group E:
    - Basel (Switzerland) 2–3 (Italy) Roma
    - CFR Cluj (Romania) 0–4 (Germany) **Bayern Munich**
      - Standings (after 4 matches): Bayern Munich 12 points, Roma 6, CFR Cluj, Basel 3.
  - Group F:
    - **Chelsea** (England) 4–1 (Russia) Spartak Moscow
    - Žilina (Slovakia) 0–7 (France) Marseille
      - Standings (after 4 matches): Chelsea 12 points, Spartak Moscow, Marseille 6, Žilina 0.
  - Group G:
    - Auxerre (France) 2–1 (Netherlands) Ajax
    - Milan (Italy) 2–2 (Spain) **Real Madrid**
      - Filippo Inzaghi scores both goals for Milan to get level with Raúl as the top scorer in European club competitions with 70 goals.
      - Standings (after 4 matches): Real Madrid 10 points, Milan 5, Ajax 4, Auxerre 3.
  - Group H:
    - Partizan (Serbia) 0–1 (Portugal) Braga
    - Shakhtar Donetsk (Ukraine) 2–1 (England) Arsenal
      - Standings (after 4 matches): Arsenal, Shakhtar Donetsk 9 points, Braga 6, Partizan 0.
- Copa Sudamericana Quarterfinals, first leg:
  - Deportes Tolima (Colombia) 2–2 (Argentina) Independiente

==== Volleyball ====
- Women's World Championship in Japan: (teams in **bold** advance to the second round)
  - Pool A in Tokyo:
    - **Peru** 3–1 Costa Rica
    - Algeria 0–3 **Poland**
    - **Japan** 3–1 **Serbia**
      - Final standings: Japan 10 points, Serbia 9, Poland 8, Peru 7, Costa Rica 6, Algeria 5.
  - Pool B in Hamamatsu:
    - Puerto Rico 0–3 **Netherlands**
    - Kenya 0–3 **Czech Republic**
    - **Italy** 0–3 **Brazil**
      - Final standings: Brazil 10 points, Netherlands, Italy, Czech Republic 8, Puerto Rico 6, Kenya 5.
  - Pool C in Matsumoto:
    - Kazakhstan 0–3 Croatia
    - **Germany** 3–0 **Thailand**
    - **Cuba** 1–3 **United States**
      - Final standings: USA 10 points, Germany 9, Cuba, Thailand, Croatia 7, Kazakhstan 5.
  - Pool D in Osaka:
    - Canada 1–3 Dominican Republic
    - **South Korea** 3–2 **Turkey**
    - **China** 0–3 **Russia**
      - Final standings: Russia 10 points, South Korea 9, Turkey 8, China 7, Dominican Republic 6, Canada 5.

=== November 2, 2010 (Tuesday) ===
==== Baseball ====
- Japan Series:
  - Game 3, Chiba Lotte Marines 7, Chunichi Dragons 1. Marines lead series 2–1.

==== Cricket ====
- Pakistan vs South Africa in UAE:
  - 3rd ODI in Dubai: South Africa 228/9 (50 overs; Hashim Amla 119*); Pakistan 226/9 (50 overs). **South Africa win by 2 runs; lead 5-match series 2–1.**

==== Football (soccer) ====
- African Women's Championship in South Africa:
  - Group B:
    - Equatorial Guinea 2–2 Cameroon
    - Algeria 1–2 Ghana
- CONCACAF Women's Gold Cup in Cancún, Mexico: (teams in **bold** advance to the semifinals)
  - Group A:
    - Guyana 1–4 Trinidad and Tobago
    - **Mexico** 0–3 **Canada**
      - Final standings: Canada 9 points, Mexico 6, Trinidad and Tobago 3, Guyana 0.
- Caribbean Championship Qualifying Group Stage Two:
  - Group F in Marabella, Trinidad and Tobago:
    - Haiti 0–0 Guyana
    - Trinidad and Tobago 6–2 Saint Vincent
- UEFA Champions League group stage, matchday 4:
  - Group A:
    - Tottenham Hotspur (England) 3–1 (Italy) Internazionale
    - Werder Bremen (Germany) 0–2 (Netherlands) Twente
      - Standings (after 4 matches): Tottenham Hotspur, Internazionale 7 points, Twente 5, Werder Bremen 2.
  - Group B:
    - Hapoel Tel Aviv (Israel) 0–0 (Germany) Schalke 04
    - Benfica (Portugal) 4–3 (France) Lyon
      - Standings (after 4 matches): Lyon 9 points, Schalke 04 7, Benfica 6, Hapoel Tel Aviv 1.
  - Group C:
    - Valencia (Spain) 3–0 (Scotland) Rangers
    - Bursaspor (Turkey) 0–3 (England) Manchester United
      - Standings (after 4 matches): Manchester United 10 points, Valencia 7, Rangers 5, Bursaspor 0.
  - Group D:
    - Rubin Kazan (Russia) 0–0 (Greece) Panathinaikos
    - Copenhagen (Denmark) 1–1 (Spain) Barcelona
      - Standings (after 4 matches): Barcelona 8 points, Copenhagen 7, Rubin Kazan 3, Panathinaikos 2.
- Copa Sudamericana Quarterfinals, first leg:
  - Newell's Old Boys (Argentina) 0–0 (Ecuador) LDU Quito

==== Horse racing ====
- Melbourne Cup in Melbourne: (gold) Americain (trainer: Alain de Royer-Dupré; jockey: Gérald Mossé) (silver) Maluckyday (trainer: John Hawkes; jockey: Luke Nolen) (bronze) So You Think (trainer: Bart Cummings; jockey: Steven Arnold)

==== Volleyball ====
- Women's World Championship in Japan: (teams in **bold** advance to the second round)
  - Pool A in Tokyo:
    - **Serbia** 3–0 Algeria
    - **Poland** 3–0 Peru
    - Costa Rica 0–3 **Japan**
      - Standings (after 4 matches): Japan, Serbia 8 points, Poland 6, Peru, Costa Rica 5, Algeria 4.
  - Pool B in Hamamatsu:
    - **Brazil** 3–0 Puerto Rico
    - Netherlands 3–0 Kenya
    - Czech Republic 3–2 **Italy**
      - Standings (after 4 matches): Brazil 8 points, Italy 7, Netherlands, Czech Republic 6, Puerto Rico 5, Kenya 4.
  - Pool C in Matsumoto:
    - Croatia 0–3 **Germany**
    - Thailand 0–3 Cuba
    - **United States** 3–0 Kazakhstan
      - Standings (after 4 matches): USA 8 points, Germany 7, Thailand, Cuba 6, Croatia 5, Kazakhstan 4.
  - Pool D in Osaka:
    - **Turkey** 3–2 Canada
    - **Russia** 3–1 **South Korea**
    - Dominican Republic 0–3 **China**
      - Standings (after 4 matches): Russia 8 points, South Korea, Turkey 7, China 6, Dominican Republic, Canada 4.

=== November 1, 2010 (Monday) ===
==== American football ====
- NFL Monday Night Football, Week 8: Indianapolis Colts 30, Houston Texans 17

==== Baseball ====
- World Series:
  - Game 5, San Francisco Giants 3, Texas Rangers 1. **Giants win series 4–1.**
    - The Giants win their first World Series since 1954, when they were in New York. Édgar Rentería, whose three-run homer in the seventh inning gave the Giants all the runs they needed, is named Series MVP.

==== Football (soccer) ====
- African Women's Championship in South Africa:
  - Group A: Nigeria 5–0 Mali
- CONCACAF Women's Gold Cup in Cancún, Mexico: (teams in **bold** advance to the semifinals)
  - Group B:
    - Guatemala 0–1 Haiti
    - **United States** 4–0 **Costa Rica**
      - Final standings: United States 9 points, Costa Rica 6, Haiti 3, Guatemala 0.
