= 2019–20 Macedonian First League =

28th season of the Macedonian basketball competition

Macedonian First League
- Season: 2019–20
- Teams: 10
- TV partner: Macedonian Radio Television

The 2019–20 Macedonian First League is the 28th season of the Macedonian First League, with 10 teams participating in it. MZT Skopje Aerodrom are the defending champions.

On 12 March 2020, the competition was postponed due to the coronavirus pandemic in North Macedonia.

== Competition format ==
Ten teams that compose the league will play a double-legged round robin tournament.

== Teams ==
Location of teams in the 2019–20 Macedonian First League

The second team of MZT Skopje (MZT Skopje Uni Banka) and Akademija FMP were promoted. Two clubs from Gevgelia, Blokotehna and Kožuv, merged into one club, while Shkupi was relegated. On September 30, AV Ohrid was dissolved, so the beginning of this season was delayed to October, 12.

Team	Home City	Arena	Colour	Coach
Akademija FMP	Skopje	Nezavisna Makedonija		(North Macedonia) Igor Gacov
EuroNickel 2005	Kavadarci	Jasmin		(North Macedonia) Goran Samardziev
Gostivar 2015	Gostivar	Mladost Gostivar		(North Macedonia) Marjan Srbinovski
Kožuv	Gevgelija	26-ti April		(North Macedonia) Aleksandar Jončevski
Kumanovo 2009	Kumanovo	Sports Hall Kumanovo		(North Macedonia) Aleksandar Petrović
MZT Skopje Aerodrom	Skopje	Jane Sandanski Arena		(North Macedonia) Gjorgji Kočov
MZT Skopje Uni Banka	Skopje	Jane Sandanski Arena		(North Macedonia) Goran Krstevski
Pelister	Bitola	Sports Hall Mladost		(Serbia) Zoran Todorović
Rabotnički	Skopje	Gradski Park		(North Macedonia) Dimitar Mirakovski
Vardar	Skopje	Kale		(North Macedonia) Darko Radulović

Teams that play in the 2019–20 Second Adriatic League

== Regular season ==
=== League table ===
Pos	Team	Pld	W	L	GF	GA	GD	Pts
1	MZT Skopje Aerodrom	17	14	3	1427	1244	+183	31
2	Rabotnički	17	12	5	1469	1331	+138	29
3	Gostivar	17	12	5	1429	1302	+127	29
4	Kožuv	17	11	6	1436	1259	+177	28
5	EuroNickel 2005	17	11	6	1370	1302	+68	28
6	Kumanovo 2009	17	10	7	1340	1298	+42	27
7	Pelister	17	8	9	1391	1396	−5	25
8	Akademija FMP	17	4	13	1239	1369	−130	21
9	Vardar	17	3	14	1240	1475	−235	20
10	MZT Skopje Uni Banka	17	0	17	1216	1518	−302	17

Source: Macedonian Basketball Federation

=== Results ===
Home \ Away	ENI	FMP	GOS	KOZ	KUM	MZT	MZ2	PEL	RAB	VAR
EuroNickel 2005	—	85–69	83–69	68–91	0	92–78	80–65	91–69	78–76	82–66
Akademija FMP	59–68	—	58–67	83–73	80–93	66–71	84–79	58–68	87–83	95–66
Gostivar	94–87	95–75	—	81–71	72–85	80–78	89–69	0	93–79	77–68
Kožuv	86–61	87–78	87–82	—	83–63	76–78	112–65	95–75	0	87–65
Kumanovo 2009	86–85	97–71	79–91	79–67	—	60–73	95–65	84–79	70–72	81–70
MZT Skopje Aerodrom	93–60	78–62	72–78	76–74	75–58	—	108–77	83–59	92–90	97–80
MZT Skopje Uni Banka	61–96	0	76–106	78–101	65–79	80–93	—	77–86	72–89	75–95
Pelister	82–88	92–77	89–79	66–80	88–70	84–89	83–77	—	110–115	96–81
Rabotnički	76–74	88–60	91–90	97–81	77–72	68–93	103–58	81–70	—	81–76
Vardar	82–92	79–77	55–86	64–85	85–89	0	82–77	71–95	55–103	—

Source: Macedonian Basketball Federation
Legend: Blue = home team win; Red = away team win.
