= Ljubiša Dimitrovski =

Macedonian basketball player

Çair 2030
- Position: Shooting guard
- League: Macedonian League

Personal information
- Born: February 25, 2002 (age 24) Macedonia
- Listed height: 1.93 m (6 ft 4 in)

Career information
- Playing career: 2019–present

Career history
- 2019–2020: MZT Skopje
- 2020: →MZT Skopje 2
- 2020–2021: Akademija FMP
- 2021–2022: Rabotnički
- 2023–2024: Shkupi
- 2024–present: Çair 2030

Ljubiša Dimitrovski (born February 25, 2002) is a Macedonian professional basketball shooting guard for Çair 2030.

== Professional career ==
On October 3, 2019, he made his debut for MZT Skopje scoring 2 points in 110-88 win over Sloboda Tuzla at home.
