= Oliver Dvojakovski =

Macedonian basketball player (born 1997)

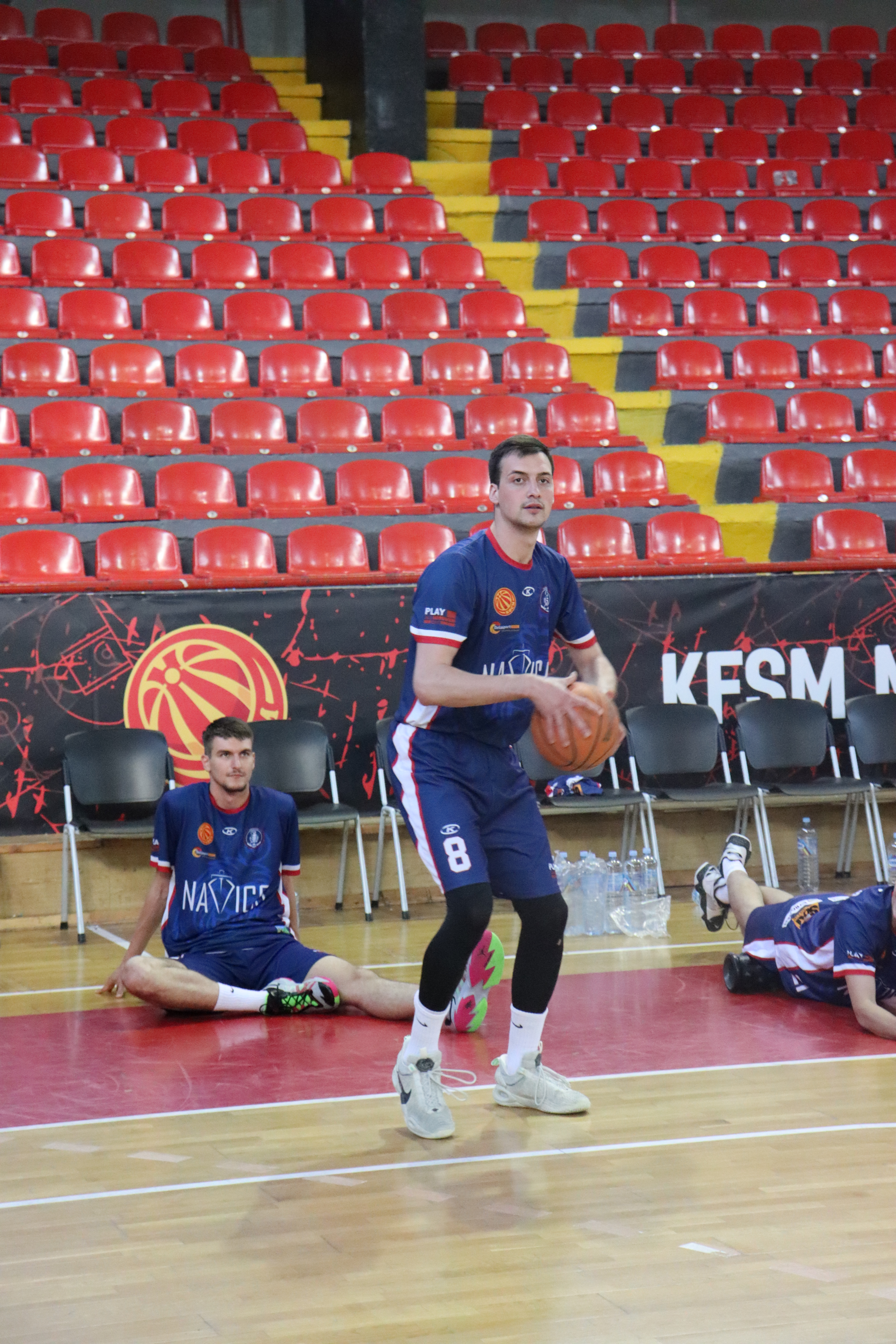
- Oliver Dvojakovski warming up as player of KK Naviko Akademija FMP in the 2021-22 season

Madzari
- Position: Power forward / small forward
- League: Macedonian First League

Personal information
- Born: January 26, 1997 (age 29) Berovo, Republic of Macedonia
- Listed height: 2.04 m (6 ft 8 in)
- Listed weight: 97 kg (214 lb)

Career information
- Playing career: 2015–present

Career history
- 2015–2016: L Alfas - P.N. Serra Gelada
- 2016–2018: Club Santo Domingo Betanzos
- 2018–2019: AV Ohrid
- 2019–2020: Kumanovo
- 2020–2022: Akademija FMP
- 2022–2023: Pelister
- 2023: EuroNickel 2005
- 2023–2024: Shkupi
- 2024–2025: Rabotnički
- 2025–2025: MZT Skopje
- 2026–present: Madzari

Career highlights
- Macedonian Cup winner (2025)

Oliver Dvojakovski (born January 26, 1997) in Berovo is a Macedonian professional basketball player who plays for Madzari of the Macedonian First League. Standing at 2.04 m (6 ft 8 1/2 in), he primarily plays at the power forward position, but he can also play at the small forward position.

== Career ==
He started his youth basketball career in Spain. He played for the youth categories of Real Betis. From 2015 to 2018 he played in L Alfas - P.N. Serra Gelada and Santo Domingo Betanzos in Liga EBA. He has also played for the youth categories of Macedonia national team.

In 2018 he returns to Macedonia and continues his career in AV Ohrid. In the 2019/2020 season he played for Kumanovo. In November 2020 he signed a contract with Akademija FMP. From July 2022 he is a new basketball player of Pelister. After Pelister, in summer 2023 he joined EuroNickel 2005.
