= 2020–21 Macedonian First League =

Macedonian First League
- Season: 2020–21
- Teams: 12
- TV partner: Macedonian Radio Television

Finals
- Champions: MZT Skopje Aerodrom
- Runners-up: EuroNickel 2005
- Semifinalists: Rabotnički; Pelister

The 2020–21 Macedonian First League is the 29th season of the Macedonian First League, with 12 teams participating in it. The season began in October 2020.

== Competition format ==
Twelve teams that compose the league will play a double-legged round robin tournament. The top six teams supposed to compete in the Superleague. The teams that finish from 7th to 12th position on the table, supposed to play in the "Play-out" league and the last four teams at the end of season would be relegated.

However, the competition format was changed in midseason. Instead of playing the Superleague, the first eight teams at the end of regular season will compete in the Playoff tournament and the last four teams will compete in Playoff tournament where two defeated teams will be relegated.

== Teams ==
Location of teams in the 2020–21 Macedonian First League

TFT Skopje and Crn Drim were promoted, while no team was relegated.

Team	Home City	Arena	Colour	Coach
Akademija FMP	Skopje	Nezavisna Makedonija		
Crn Drim	Struga			
EuroNickel 2005	Kavadarci	Jasmin		
Gostivar 2015	Gostivar	Mladost Gostivar		
Kožuv	Gevgelija	26-ti April		
Kumanovo 2009	Kumanovo	Sports Hall Kumanovo		
MZT Skopje Aerodrom	Skopje	Jane Sandanski Arena		
MZT Skopje Uni Banka	Skopje	Jane Sandanski Arena		
Pelister	Bitola	Sports Hall Mladost		
Rabotnički	Skopje	Gradski Park		
TFT	Skopje	Forza Sport Center		
Vardar	Skopje	Kale		

Teams that play in the 2020–21 Second Adriatic League
Teams that play in the 2020–21 Balkan League

== Regular season ==
=== League table ===
Pos	Team	Pld	W	L	GF	GA	GD	Pts	Qualification
1	Pelister	22	17	5	2199	1780	+419	39	Qualification to the playoff
2	Rabotnički	22	15	7	1791	1760	+31	37	Qualification to the playoff
3	EuroNickel 2005	22	15	7	1966	1868	+98	37	Qualification to the playoff
4	MZT Skopje Aerodrom	22	14	8	1901	1693	+208	36	Qualification to the playoff
5	Kumanovo 2009	22	13	9	1863	1804	+59	35	Qualification to the playoff
6	Gostivar	22	13	9	1903	1856	+47	35	Qualification to the playoff
7	TFT Skopje	22	12	10	1846	1827	+19	34	Qualification to the playoff
8	Akademija FMP	22	11	11	1720	1765	−45	33	Qualification to the playoff
9	Kožuv	22	10	12	1774	1787	−13	32	Qualification to the playout
10	MZT Skopje Uni Banka	22	6	16	1660	1836	−176	28	Qualification to the playout
11	Vardar	22	4	18	1710	2021	−311	26	Qualification to the playout
12	Crn Drim	22	2	20	1636	1972	−336	24	Qualification to the playout

Updated to match(es) played on 26 April 2021. Source: Macedonian Basketball Federation

== Playoff ==
Quarterfinals
1	Pelister	2
8	Akademija FMP	0
4	MZT Skopje Aerodrom	2
5	Kumanovo 2009	1
2	Rabotnički	2
7	TFT Skopje	0
3	EuroNickel 2005	2
6	Gostivar	0

Semifinals
1	Pelister	0
4	MZT Skopje Aerodrom	2
2	Rabotnički	0
3	EuroNickel 2005	2

Final
4	MZT Skopje Aerodrom	3
3	EuroNickel 2005	0

== Playout ==
Team 1	Series	Team 2	Game 1	Game 2	Game 3
Kozuv	2–1	Crn Drim	80–83	85–78	91–78
MZT Skopje Uni Banka	2–0	Vardar	85–78	20–0	
