= 2018–19 BIBL season =

2018–19 BIBL
- Season: 2018–19
- Dates: 16 October 2018 – 7 April 2019
- Games played: 88
- Teams: 7
- TV partner(s): sportmedia.tv YouTube; RTSH

Finals
- Champions: (North Macedonia) Blokotehna (1st title)
- Runners-up: (Albania) Teuta

The 2018–19 BIBL season is the 11th edition of Balkan International Basketball League (BIBL). The competition started on 16 October 2018.

== Competition format ==
Originally eight teams joined the competition, but Prishtina 2019 withdrew its participation in January due to the commitment in the FIBA Europe Cup.

The remaining seven teams play a round robin tournament where each team faced the others in home and away games. The top four teams qualify directly for the Final Four.

== Regular season ==
Pos	Team	Pld	W	L	GF	GA	GD	Pts	Qualification	BER	BLO	ACA	TEU	KOZ	BAS	BAR
1	(Bulgaria) Beroe	12	11	1	1156	925	+231	23	Advance to Final Four	—	91–81	92–78	108–65	69–62	133–80	100–69
2	(North Macedonia) Blokotehna	12	9	3	1029	905	+124	21	Advance to Final Four	100–104	—	89–74	90–62	89–85	96–70	85–72
3	(Bulgaria) Academic Bultex 99	12	8	4	1067	910	+157	20	Advance to Final Four	86–95	82–77	—	89–73	88–57	109–59	81–67
4	(Albania) Teuta	12	8	4	953	977	−24	20	Advance to Final Four	87–85	61–70	89–86	—	79–70	88–64	73–71
5	(North Macedonia) Kožuv	12	3	9	918	984	−66	15		85–94	57–77	86–91	85–94	—	90–74	83–76
6	(Kosovo) Bashkimi	12	2	10	889	1162	−273	14		77–107	77–92	65–105	83–101	80–76	—	85–84
7	(Kazakhstan) Barsy Atyrau	12	1	11	859	1008	−149	13		60–78	70–83	61–102	76–81	73–82	81–75	—

Source: BIBL

== Final Four ==
The BIBL Final Four is the final stage of the competition that follows the regular season. Will be played in a single knock-out match on April 6, 2019 and April 7, 2019 in Tirana, at the Feti Borova Sport Hall in the Tirana Olympic Park.

Semifinals
6 April
(North Macedonia) Blokotehna	79
(Bulgaria) Academic Bultex 99	74
6 April
(Bulgaria) Beroe	68
(Albania) Teuta	80

Final
7 April
(North Macedonia) Blokotehna	82
(Albania) Teuta	68
Third place
7 April
(Bulgaria) Academic Bultex 99	86
(Bulgaria) Beroe	57

=== Semifinals ===
6 April 2019
17:00

Report

Blokotehna (North Macedonia)	79–74	(Bulgaria) Academic Bultex 99
Scoring by quarter: 16−19, 25−21, 21−17, 17−17
Pts: Mladenović 22; Rebs: Đumić 9 Asts: Nikolić 5		Pts: Bachev, Vitković 16; Rebs: Vujović 9 Asts: Bachev 5

Feti Borova Sport Hall, Tirana
Attendance: 120
Referees: Haris Bijedić, Gentian Çiçi, Stelios Symeonides

6 April 2019
19:30

Report

Beroe (Bulgaria)	68–80	(Albania) Teuta
Scoring by quarter: 20−20, 18−15, 22−12, 8−23
Pts: Frankamp 26; Rebs: Yanev 8 Asts: Frankamp 5		Pts: Wilson 20; Rebs: Hysenagolli 10; Asts: Wilson 9

Feti Borova Sport Hall, Tirana
Attendance: 430
Referees: Ognjen Jokić, Aleksandar Milojevik, Diamantis Lortos

=== Third place ===
7 April 2019
16:00

Report

Academic Bultex 99 (Bulgaria)	86–57	(Bulgaria) Beroe
Scoring by quarter: 17−20, 30−14, 17−15, 22−8
Pts: Gruev 21; Rebs: Vujović, Olisemeka 9 Asts: Franklin, Gruev 4		Pts: Coggins 13; Rebs: Jennings 11; Asts: Frankamp, Miller 4

Feti Borova Sport Hall, Tirana
Attendance: 100
Referees: Aleksandar Milojevik, Gentian Çiçi, Diamantis Lortos

=== Final ===
7 April 2019
18:30

Report

Blokotehna (North Macedonia)	82–68	(Albania) Teuta
Scoring by quarter: 25−9, 17−21, 28−15, 12−23
Pts: Penn 31; Rebs: Đumić 10; Asts: Mladenović 8		Pts: Hamati 18; Rebs: Hysenagolli 10; Asts: Brown 5

Feti Borova Sport Hall, Tirana
Attendance: 900
Referees: Ognjen Jokić, Haris Bijedić, Stelios Symeonides

2018–19 Balkan League Champions

Blokotehna
1st Title
