= Metodija Bešliovski =

Macedonian coach and former basketball player

Personal information
- Born: August 19, 1996 (age 30) Skopje, North Macedonia
- Listed height: 2.01 m (6 ft 7 in)

Career information
- Playing career: 2015–2021
- Position: Small forward
- Coaching career: 2020–present

Career history

Playing
- 2015–2016: Vardar
- 2016–2017: Feni Industries
- 2018: Karpoš Sokoli
- 2018–2019: Kumanovo
- 2019–2020: Akademija FMP
- 2020–2021: Kožuv

Coaching
- 2020–2021: KK Feniks (assistant)
- 2021–2022: KK Vardar (assistant)
- 2022–2023: KSE Salgótarjáni (assistant)
- 2023–2024: KK TFT (assistant)
- 2024: Iraklis (assistant)

Metodija Bešliovski (born August 19, 1996) is a Macedonian former professional basketball Small forward.
