= Goran Glavčev =

Macedonian basketball player

Kumanovo
- Position: Shooting guard
- League: Macedonian First League

Personal information
- Born: June 19, 1993 (age 33) Gevgelija, Macedonia
- Listed height: 1.91 m (6 ft 3 in)

Career information
- Playing career: 2011–present

Career history
- 2011–2016: Kožuv
- 2016: Mladost Zemun
- 2016–2017: Kožuv
- 2017: Radoviš
- 2017–2019: Blokotehna
- 2019–2020: Rabotnički
- 2020–2021: Akademija FMP
- 2021–2025: Kožuv
- 2025–present: Kumanovo

Goran Glavčev (born June 19, 1993) is a Macedonian professional basketball Shooting guard who currently plays for Kumanovo in the Macedonian First League.
