= Filip Bakoč =

Macedonian basketball player

No. 11 – Rabotnički
- Position: Power forward
- League: Macedonian League

Personal information
- Born: May 2, 1996 (age 30) Skopje, Macedonia
- Listed height: 2.04 m (6 ft 8 in)
- Listed weight: 102 kg (225 lb)

Career history
- 2013–2017: Karpoš Sokoli
- 2017–2018: AV Ohrid
- 2018–2020: EuroNickel 2005
- 2020–2021: MZT Skopje
- 2021–2022: Akademija FMP
- 2022–present: Rabotnički

Career highlights
- Macedonian Cup (2021); Macedonian League champion (2021)

Filip Bakoč (Macedonian: Филип Бакоч; born May 2, 1996) is a Macedonian professional basketball power forward for KK Rabotnički in the Macedonian First League. He is also member of Macedonia national basketball team
