= Volkanovski =

Volkanovski (Macedonian: Волкановски) is a Macedonian surname. Notable people with the surname include:

- Alexander Volkanovski (born 1988), Australian professional mixed martial artist
- Ivan Volkanovski (born 1999), Macedonian professional basketball player
