= Ivan Volkanovski =

Macedonian basketball player

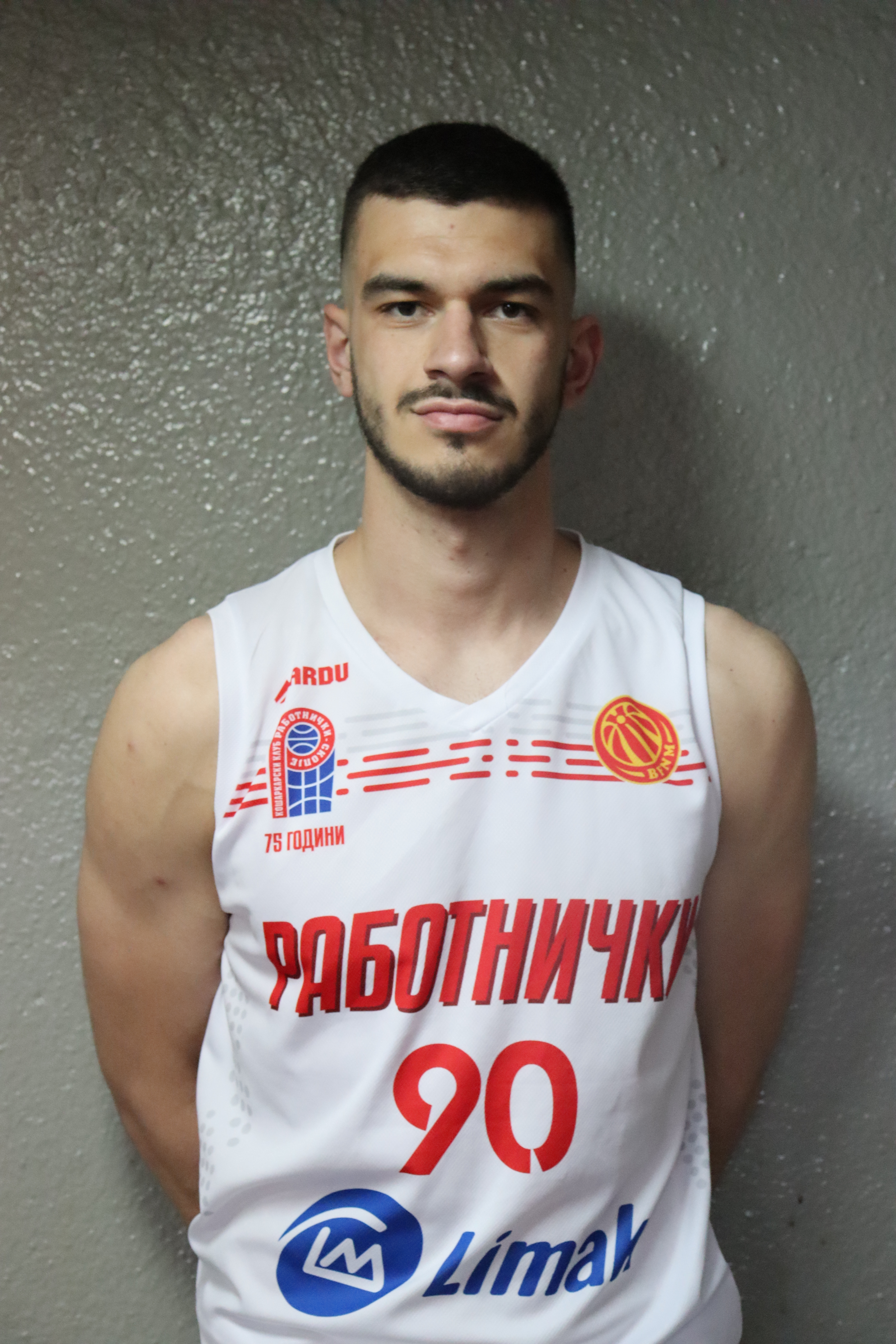

KK Rabotnički
- Position: Center
- League: Macedonian League

Personal information
- Born: July 7, 1999 (age 27) Ohrid, Macedonia
- Listed height: 2.09 m (6 ft 10 in)

Career information
- Playing career: 2018–present

Career history
- 2018–2019: Vardar
- 2019: AV Ohrid
- 2019–2020: MZT Skopje
- 2019–2020: → MZT Skopje 2
- 2020–present: Kumanovo

Ivan Volkanovski (born July 7, 1999) is a Macedonian professional basketball Center who plays for KK Rabotnički.

== Professional career ==
On August 12, 2019, he signed a contract with MZT Skopje.
