= Dimitrovski =

Dimitrovski (Macedonian: Димитровски) or female version Dimitrovska (Macedonian: Димитровска, Slovak: Dimitrovská) is a Macedonian surname that literally means "son of Dimitar", famous people with the surname include:

- Aleksandar Dimitrovski (born 1980), Macedonian basketball player
- Dejan Dimitrovski (born 1979), Macedonian footballer
- Dragan Dimitrovski (born 1977), Macedonian footballer (striker)
- Ivan Dimitrovski (born 1998), Macedonian handball player
- Kočo Dimitrovski (born 1950), Macedonian footballer
- Ljubiša Dimitrovski (born 2002), Macedonian basketball player
- Vasko Dimitrovski (born 1982), Macedonian handball player
- Vladimir Dimitrovski (born 1988), Macedonian footballer (left back)

== See also ==
- Dimitrov (surname)
