= Lefkofsky =

Lefkofsky is an Ashkenazi Jewish (Yiddish) surname in West Slavic form. Notable people with the surname include:

- Stella Lefkofsky (born 2002), American singer-Songwriter known professionally as Stella Lefty
- Eric Lefkofsky (born 1969), American businessman

== See also ==
- Lefkoski
- Lepkowski
