= Cvetkovski =

Cvetkovski (Macedonian: Цветковски) is a Macedonian-language surname. Notable people with the surname include:

- Andrej Cvetkovski (born 1996), Macedonian basketball player
- Jane Cvetkovski (born 1987), Macedonian handball player
- Michael Cvetkovski (born 1987), Macedonian-Australian footballer
