= Siniša Avramovski =

Macedonian basketball player

Personal information
- Born: September 2, 1983 (age 43) Skopje, Macedonia, Yugoslavia
- Listed height: 2.08 m (6 ft 10 in)
- Listed weight: 205 lb (93 kg)

Career information
- Playing career: 2000–2018
- Position: Center

Career history
- 2000–2003: MZT Skopje
- 2003: Crvena zvezda
- 2003: OKK Beograd
- 2004: Nemetali Ogražden
- 2004–2006: Vardar
- 2006–2007: CSKA Sofia
- 2007: Cherno More
- 2007–2008: Apollon Limassol BC
- 2008: Otopeni
- 2008: Griffon Simferopol
- 2008–2009: MZT Skopje
- 2009–2010: Bashkimi
- 2010–2011: MZT Skopje
- 2011–2012: Lirija
- 2012: Chang Thailand Slammers
- 2012–2014: Rabotnički
- 2014: Primorje
- 2014–2015: Vodnjanski Lisici
- 2015–2016: Elektra Šoštanj
- 2016: Shkupi
- 2017: Radoviš
- 2017–2018: Blokotehna

Siniša Avramovski (born September 2, 1983) is a Macedonian former professional basketball center who last played for Blokotehna.
