= Andrej Nastovski =

Macedonian basketball player

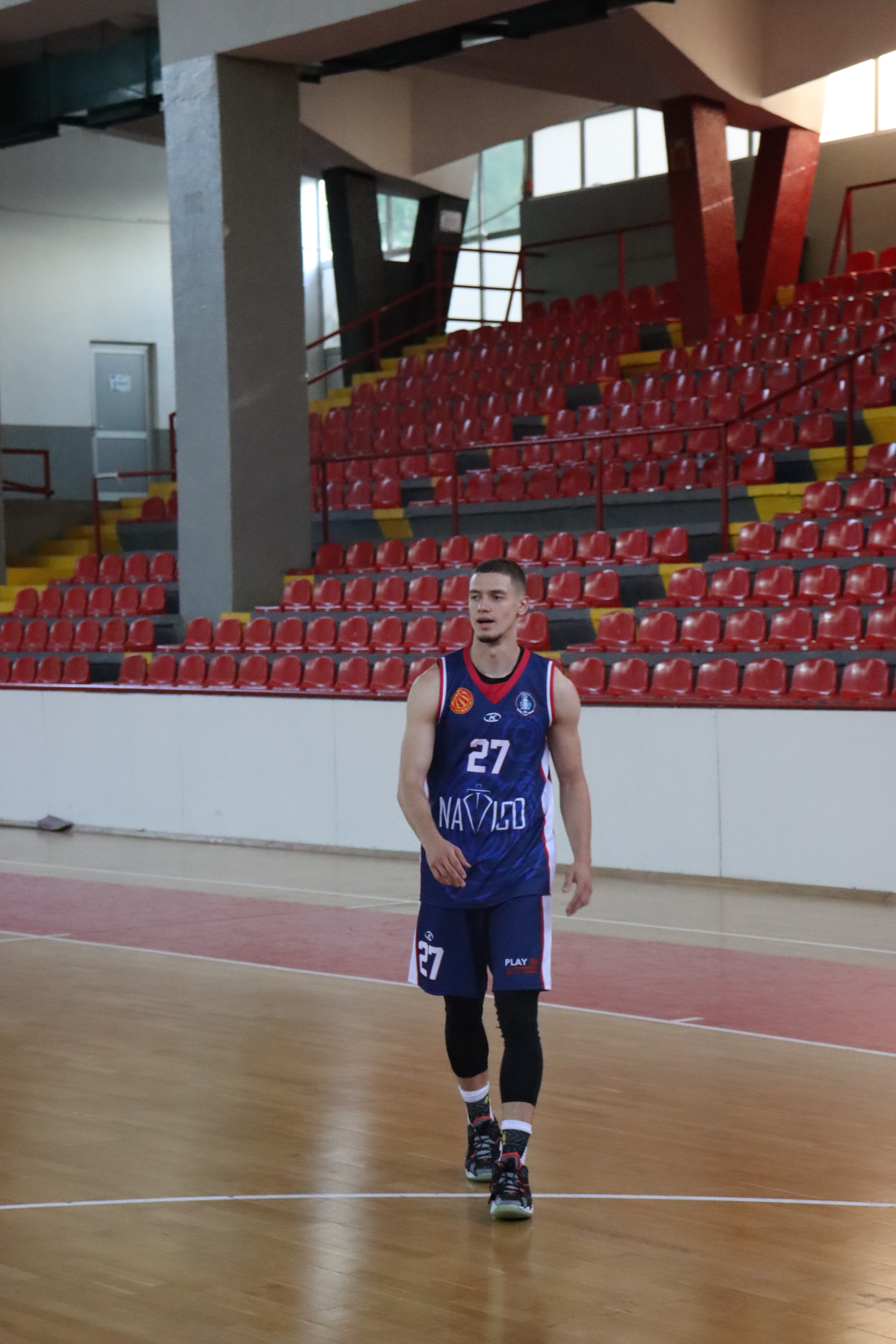

Crn Drim
- Position: Point guard
- League: Macedonian League

Personal information
- Born: August 23, 2000 (age 26) Skopje, Macedonia
- Listed height: 1.93 m (6 ft 4 in)
- Listed weight: 84 kg (185 lb)

Career information
- Playing career: 2016–present

Career history
- 2016–2019: MZT Skopje Aerodrom
- 2019: AV Ohrid
- 2019–2020: Vardar
- 2020–present: Crn Drim

Career highlights
- Macedonian Cup winner (2018)

Andrej Nastovski (born August 23, 2000) is a Macedonian professional basketball Point guard who currently plays for Crn Drim.

== Professional career ==
On January 22, 2018, on his debut for MZT Skopje in ABA League he scored 3 points against Crvena zvezda in a 58:92 home lose. Two days later, he made his debut for MZT Skopje in Macedonian League scoring 16 points and 9 assists in a home win against Shkupi.
