= Vojče Lefkoski =

Macedonian basketball player (b. 1991)

Gostivar
- Position: Small forward / shooting guard
- League: Macedonian First League

Personal information
- Born: March 8, 1991 (age 35) Gostivar, SR Macedonia, SFR Yugoslavia
- Listed height: 6 ft 4 in (1.93 m)

Career information
- Playing career: 2009–present

Career history
- 2009–2010: Gostivar
- 2010–2014: Vardar
- 2014–2015: T-Basket Tetovo
- 2016–2017: Vardar
- 2017–2018: AV Ohrid
- 2018–2019: Blokotehna
- 2019: AV Ohrid
- 2019–2020: Kožuv
- 2020–2021: Vardar
- 2021–present: Crn Drim

Vojče Lefkoski (born March 8, 1991), is a Macedonian professional basketball player who plays for KK Gostivar of the Macedonian First League.

== Professional career ==
On his debut for Blokotehna he scored 11 points and 3 rebounds in an 81-78 win against MZT Skopje.
