= Andrej Atanasov =

Macedonian basketball player

Crn Drim
- Position: Shooting guard
- League: Macedonian First League

Personal information
- Born: 18 November 1997 (age 28) Skopje, Macedonia
- Listed height: 1.88 m (6 ft 2 in)

Career history
- 2015–2018: Karpoš Sokoli
- 2018–2019: AV Ohrid
- 2019–2020: Kumanovo
- 2020–present: Crn Drim

Andrej Atanasov (born 18 November 1997) is a Macedonian professional basketball Shooting guard who currently plays for Crn Drim in the Macedonian First League.
