= Valmir Kakruki =

Macedonian-Kosovan basketball player

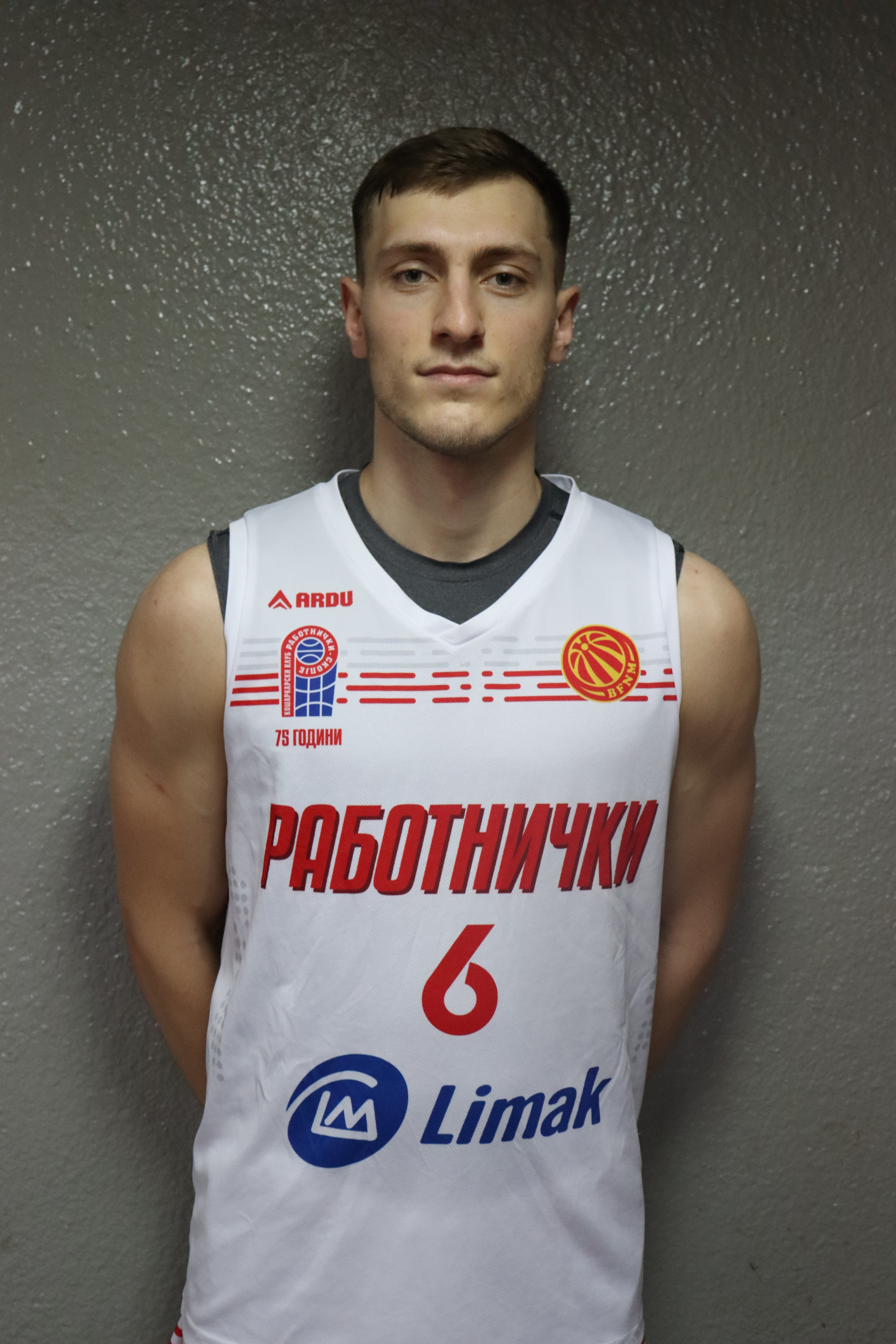
- Kakruki with Rabotnički

No. 8 – Bashkimi
- Position: Power forward / center
- League: Kosovo Basketball Superleague

Personal information
- Born: 20 September 2000 (age 26) Skopje, Macedonia
- Listed height: 2.05 m (6 ft 9 in)

Career information
- NBA draft: 2022: undrafted
- Playing career: 2018–present

Career history
- 2018–2019: Vardar
- 2020–2021: Akademija FMP
- 2021–2022: Rabotnički
- 2022–2023: Prishtina
- 2023: Bashkimi
- 2023–2025: Çair 2030
- 2025–2026: Prishtina
- 2026–present: Bashkimi

Career highlights
- Kosovo Supercup winner (2022)

Valmir Kakruki (born 20 September 2000) is a Macedonian professional basketball player for Bashkimi of the Kosovo Basketball Superleague. He is also a member of the North Macedonia national team.

== Youth career ==
Kakruki started his youth career at Shkupi. He later played for the youth team of MZT Skopje.

== Professional career ==
=== Çair 2030 (2023–2025) ===
In November 2023, Kakruki signed for Çair 2030.

=== Return to Prishtina (2025–present) ===
On 17 July 2025, he signed for Prishtina of the Kosovo Basketball Superleague.
