= Damjan Misa =

Macedonian basketball player

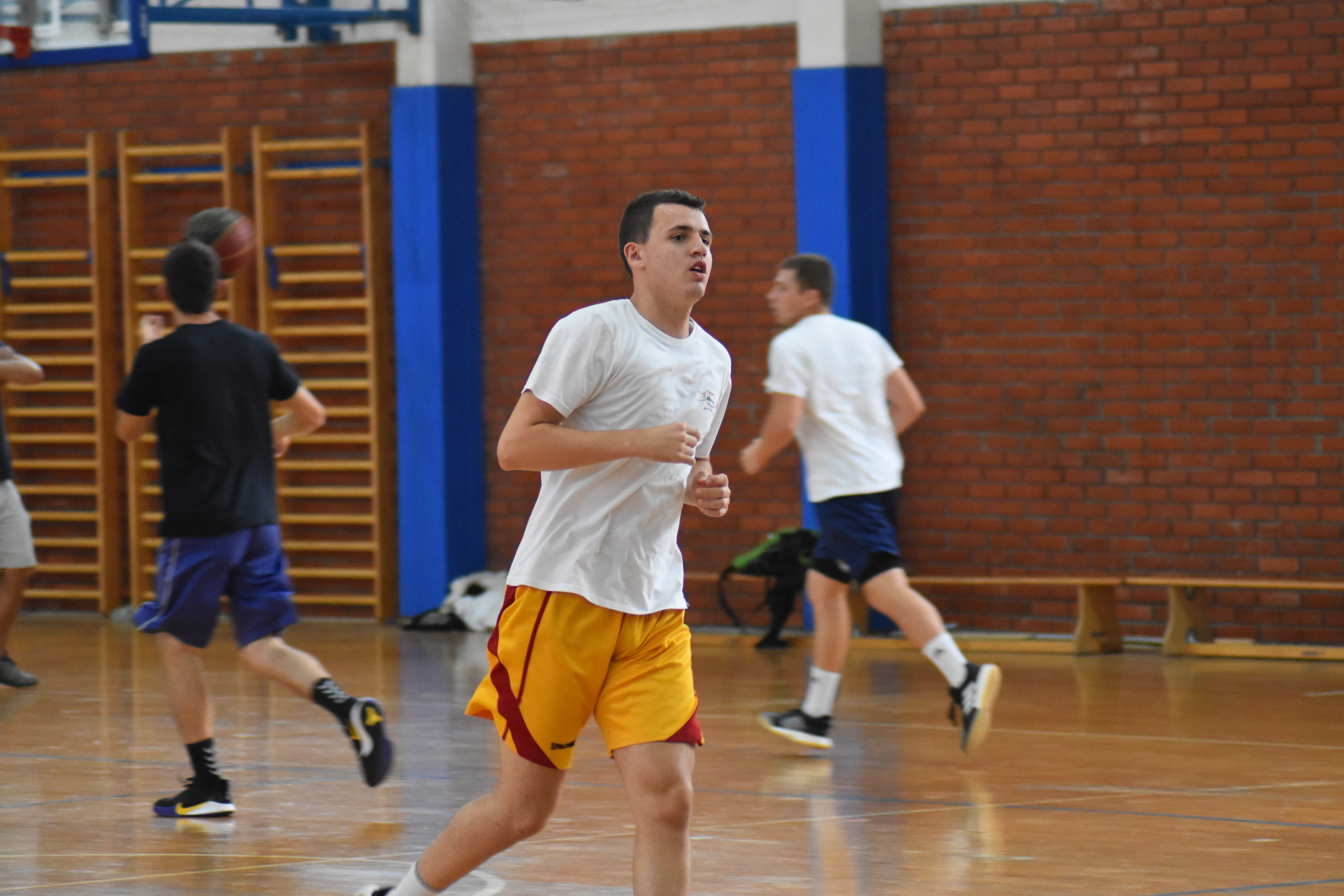

Crn Drim
- Position: Point guard
- League: Macedonian First League

Personal information
- Born: April 18, 2000 (age 26) Struga, Macedonia
- Listed height: 1.91 m (6 ft 3 in)
- Listed weight: 79 kg (174 lb)

Career information
- Playing career: 2017–present

Career history
- 2017–2018: MZT Skopje
- 2018–2020: Kumanovo
- 2020–present: Crn Drim

Career highlights
- Macedonian Cup winner (2018)

Damjan Misa (born April 18, 2000) is a Macedonian professional basketball Point guard who plays for Crn Drim.

== Professional career ==
On January 25, 2018, he had his debut for MZT Skopje in Macedonian League scoring 7 points and 4 assists in a home win against Shkupi. On August 20, 2018, he signed three-year deal with Kumanovo.
