= Povilas Gaidys =

Lithuanian basketball player (born 1991)

Free agent
- Position: Power forward

Personal information
- Born: February 21, 1991 (age 35) Druskininkai, Lithuania
- Listed height: 206 cm (6 ft 9 in)
- Listed weight: 100 kg (220 lb)

Career information
- College: Kalamazoo Valley (2010–2011) Southeastern Fire (2011–2013)
- NBA draft: 2013: undrafted
- Playing career: 2013–present

Career history
- 2013–2014: Höganäs
- 2014: Umeå BBK
- 2014: SSV Lokomotive Bernau
- 2014–2015: Raiders Villach
- 2015–2016: UBSC Raiffeisen Graz
- 2016–2018: Allianz Swans Gmunden
- 2018–2019: Blokotehna
- 2019: Umeå BBK
- 2019: EuroNickel 2005
- 2021: BC Gargždai-SC

Povilas Gaidys (born 21 February 1991) is a Lithuanian professional basketball player, who last played for EuroNickel 2005 of the Macedonian League. Standing at 208 cm (6 ft 10 in), Gaidys plays as power forward.

== College career ==
Povilas Gaidys played college basketball at the Kalamazoo Valley and Southeastern Fire. In season 2011-12 Gaidys averaged 8.2 points in 33 appearances.

== Playing career ==
In 2015, Gaidys signed with UBSC Raiffeisen Graz. In the season 2015-16 he averaged 15.3 points, 9.4 rebounds in 31.4 minutes in 28 appearances. On February 2, 2016, he signed with Allianz Swans Gmunden On August 18, 2018, he signed with Macedonian basketball club Blokotehna
