= KC Ross-Miller =

American basketball player (born 1991)

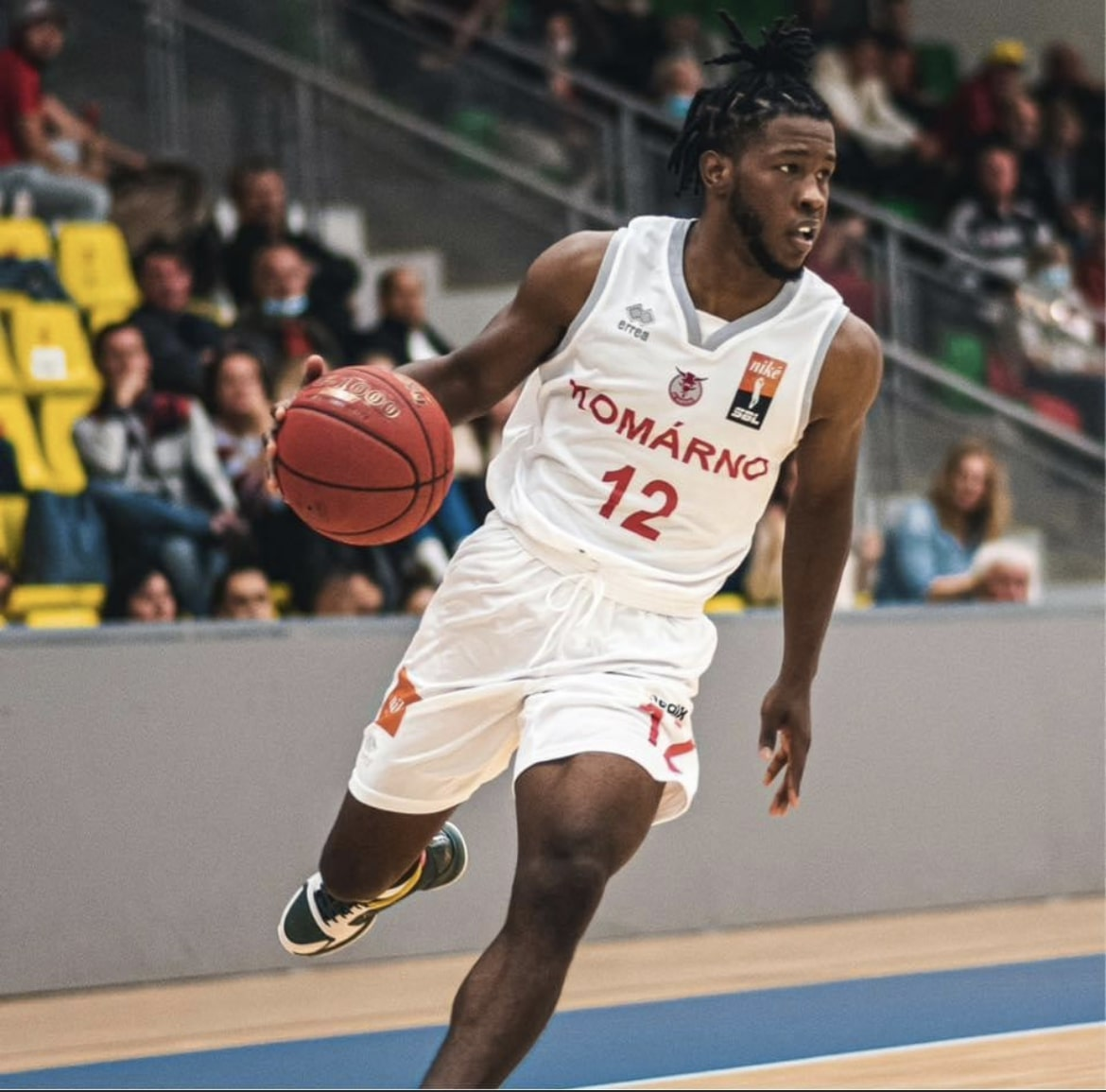

Personal information
- Born: January 4, 1991 (age 35) Tulsa, Oklahoma, U.S.
- Listed height: 6 ft 0 in (1.83 m)

Career information
- High school: God's Academy, Dalworth, Texas
- Playing career: 2010–present
- Position: Point Guard

Career history
- 2010–2011: New Orleans Privateers
- 2012–2014: New Mexico State Aggies
- 2014–2015: Auburn Tigers
- 2015–2016: Surrey Scorchers
- 2017–2019: KK AV Ohrid
- 2018–2019: MBK Handlová
- 2019–2021: PS Karlsruhe Lions
- 2019–2021: Liège Basket
- 2021–2022: MBK Komárno
- 2021–present: CSM Târgu Mureș

Kenneth Craig Ross-Miller (born January 4, 1991) is an American professional basketball player who plays for CSM Târgu Mureș in Liga 1. Previously, he has played for Surrey Scorchers, KK AV Ohrid, MBK Baník Handlová, PS Karlsruhe, and MBK Rieker Komarno.

== Early life ==
KC Ross-Miller was born on 4 January 1991 in Tulsa, Oklahoma and was raised in Grand Prairie, Texas. He received his early education from God's Academy in Dalworth, Texas.

For further education, he went to New Mexico State University and graduated with a bachelor's degree.

== Career ==
At the age of 15, he committed early to University of Kentucky.

Between 2010 and 2011, he played for New Orleans Privateers men's basketball. In 2012, he transferred to New Mexico State Aggies men's basketball where he played until 2014.

In 2014, he started studying at Auburn University and there he played for Auburn Tigers men's basketball until 2015.

In November 2015, Surrey Scorchers signed KC Ross-Miller and played in one season. Between 2017 and 2019, he played for KK AV Ohrid (ABA2).

For the 2018-2019 season, he joined MBK Handlová (Nike SBL). In the following year, he played for Liege Basket in Belgium Euromillions League and for PS Karlsruhe Lions for two seasons.

In 2021, he played for MBK Rieker Komarno in Slovak Extraliga and for CSM Targu Mures in Liga 1 where he currently plays.
