= Petar Čočoroski =

Macedonian basketball coach

Crn Drim
- Position: Head coach
- League: Macedonian First League

Personal information
- Born: March 18, 1983 (age 43) Belgrade, SR Serbia, SFR Yugoslavia
- Coaching career: 2013–present

Career history

Coaching
- 2013–2015: Crn Drim
- 2015: Macedonia U16
- 2016–2019: AV Ohrid
- 2019–present: Crn Drim

Petar Čočoroski (Anglicized: Petar Chochoroski; Macedonian: Петар Чочороски; born March 18, 1983), is a Macedonian basketball coach. He serves as a head coach for the Crn Drim of the Macedonian First League.

== Coaching career ==
Čočoroski was a head coach for the Macedonian Second League club Crn Drim from Struga for two seasons (2013–2015). In 2016, he was hired to be the head coach of the AV Ohrid.

=== National team ===
Čočoroski was a part of coaching staff for the Macedonia men's national U-16 team at 2015 FIBA Europe Under-16 Division B Championship.
