= Terry Armstrong (basketball) =

American basketball player (born 2000)

No. 35 – KK Madžari
- Position: Small forward / shooting guard
- League: Macedonian first league

Personal information
- Born: July 16, 2000 (age 26) Flint, Michigan, U.S.
- Listed height: 6 ft 7 in (2.01 m)
- Listed weight: 206 lb (93 kg)

Career information
- High school: Carman-Ainsworth (Flint, Michigan); Bella Vista Prep (Scottsdale, Arizona)
- NBA draft: 2020: undrafted
- Playing career: 2019–present

Career history
- 2019–2020: South East Melbourne Phoenix
- 2021–2022: KK Rogaška
- 2022–2023: Mladost Zemun
- 2023–2024: Metalac Valjevo
- 2024–2025: Leuven Bears
- 2025-2025: Toros del Valle
- 2026-present: Madzari

Terry Lee Armstrong II (born July 16, 2000) is an American professional basketball player for Madzari of the Macedonian first league. Listed at 6 feet 7 inches (2.01 m) and 185 pounds (84 kg), he plays the point guard and shooting guard positions.

Armstrong, who is a native of Flint, Michigan, played basketball for several high schools, spending his final two year at Bella Vista Prep. A consensus four-star recruit, he drew interest from several major NCAA Division I programs and committed to Arizona before choosing to immediately play professionally in the NBL.

== Early life ==
Armstrong grew up in the West Side of Flint, Michigan. He often played basketball with others in his neighborhood or shot around in his driveway. He is mentored by his guardian Tim Jones, who is also from Flint.

== High school career ==
As a freshman at Carman-Ainsworth High School in Flint, Armstrong began playing basketball under head coach Jay Witham in the 2015–16 season. After averaging 12.6 points per game through his first six games, he was considered one of the best freshmen in Michigan, garnering attention from prep school programs. Armstrong led his team to the regional semifinals and a 20–4 record, averaging 16 points, 5.5 rebounds, and two steals per game. He earned Class A All-State first team honors from the Associated Press and Class A All-State honorable mention recognition from the Detroit Free Press and The Detroit News.

Entering his 2016–17 sophomore year, Armstrong transferred to Joseph Wheeler High School, a school in Marietta, Georgia with a nationally recognized basketball program. He joined the team with E. J. Montgomery, one of the top recruits in the 2018 class. However, in late November, before playing a game for Wheeler, Armstrong moved to Davison High School in Davison, Michigan. He made the decision following his mother's relocation to the Davison district. Armstrong was forced to sit out his sophomore season after being ruled ineligible by the Michigan High School Athletic Association (MHSAA). While being sidelined, he dropped in national rankings and attracted decreasing attention from college programs.

As a junior in 2017–18, Armstrong transferred to Bella Vista College Preparatory School in Scottsdale, Arizona. The Bella Vista Prep basketball team, which was newly formed to replace Aspire Academy, played a national schedule and was coached by former Hillcrest Prep coach Kyle Weaver. He was named season MVP of The Grind Session during the 2017–18 season. With Bella Vista Prep and on the Amateur Athletic Union (AAU) circuit, he saw his national ranking rise again. By December 7, 2018, in his senior season, Armstrong was averaging 22.1 points and 5.4 rebounds per game. He was named the 2019 Grind Session Offensive player of the year. On March 11, 2019, he scored 14 points in a 96–94 win over SPIRE Institute and Academy to win the Grind Session World Championship final.

=== Recruiting ===
Armstrong was a consensus four-star recruit. By the end of his high school career, ESPN ranked him among the top 40 players in the 2019 class. On October 24, 2018, Armstrong committed to play for NCAA Division I basketball for Arizona, attracted by its coaching staff and environment, as well as his team fit. His other top options were New Mexico and Oklahoma.

College recruiting
Name	Hometown	School	Height	Weight	Commit date
Terry Armstrong; SG	Flint, MI	Bella Vista Prep (AZ)	6 ft 6 in (1.98 m)	185 lb (84 kg)	Oct 24, 2018
Terry Armstrong; SG	Recruit ratings: Rivals: 247Sports: ESPN: (88)				
Overall recruit ranking: Rivals: 67 247Sports: 77 ESPN: 41
Note: In many cases, Scout, Rivals, 247Sports, On3, and ESPN may conflict in their listings of height and weight.; In these cases, the average was taken. ESPN grades are on a 100-point scale.; Sources: "Arizona 2019 Basketball Commitments". Rivals.; "2019 Arizona Wildcats Recruiting Class". ESPN.; "2019 Team Ranking". Rivals.

== Professional career ==
=== South East Melbourne Phoenix (2019–2020) ===
On June 19, 2019, Armstrong revealed his intentions to skip college basketball and instead play in the NBA G League or in another country. On July 5, he signed with the South East Melbourne Phoenix in the National Basketball League (NBL), a league based in Australia. Armstrong joined the team through the NBL Next Stars program, which was created in the previous year to attract NBA draft prospects to the NBL. In September 2019, he won the dunk contest at the NBL Blitz preseason tournament. Armstrong was left out of his team's rotation for much of the season. He made eight appearances for the Phoenix and averaged 2.2 minutes per game. On April 1, 2020, Armstrong declared for the 2020 NBA draft.

=== KK Rogaška (2021–2022) ===
On August 7, 2021, Armstrong signed with KK Rogaška of the Slovenian First League.

=== KK Mladost Zemun (2022–2023) ===
On August 24, 2022, Armstrong signed with KK Mladost Zemun of the Basketball League of Serbia.

=== KK Metalac Valjevo (2023–present) ===
On November 10, 2023, Armstrong signed with KK Metalac Valjevo of the Basketball League of Serbia.

== Career statistics ==
Legend
GP	Games played	GS	Games started	MPG	Minutes per game
FG%	Field goal percentage	3P%	3-point field goal percentage	FT%	Free throw percentage
RPG	Rebounds per game	APG	Assists per game	SPG	Steals per game
BPG	Blocks per game	PPG	Points per game	**Bold**	Career high

=== NBL ===
Year	Team	GP	GS	MPG	FG%	3P%	FT%	RPG	APG	SPG	BPG	PPG
2019–20	South East Melbourne	8	0	2.2	.000	.000	1.000	.3	.3	.0	.0	.3
