= Bella Vista Private School =

Location
- 3250 N 40th St; Phoenix, Arizona 85018; United States
- 33°47′18″N 111°57′30″W

Information
- School type: Private high school
- Established: 2004
- Grades: 9–12
- Enrollment: 70 HS students (Oct. 2023 projections)
- Colors: Blue, white, and grey
- Mascot: Bears
- Website: www.bellavistaschool.com/site/

Bella Vista Private School is a 9–12 private school in Phoenix, Arizona, United States. It was founded in 2004, first as a middle school then expanding over time.

The school has moved locations over the years. It moved from Cave Creek, Arizona to rented units next to Cactus Shadows High School. It is now located in the Arcadia area of Phoenix at 3250 N 40th St.

== Notable alumni ==
- Terry Armstrong (2019), basketball player who plays professionally in Serbia
- Zion Harmon (2021), basketball player for the Seton Hall Pirates
