= Jericole Hellems =

American basketball player

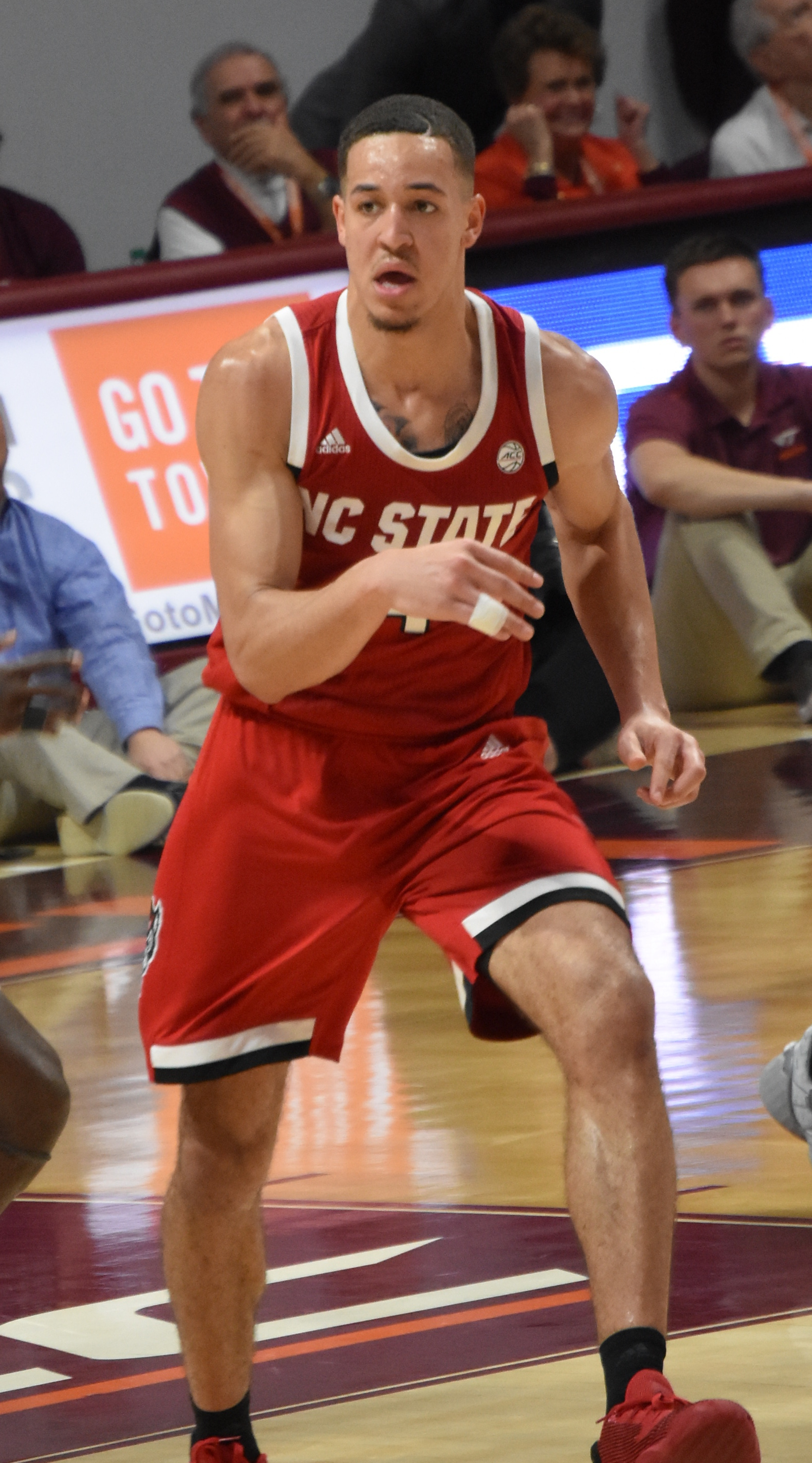
- Hellems with NC State in 2020

No. 99 – Bora
- Position: Small forward
- League: Kosovo Basketball Superleague

Personal information
- Born: October 6, 1999 (age 27)
- Listed height: 6 ft 7 in (2.01 m)
- Listed weight: 205 lb (93 kg)

Career information
- High school: Chaminade College Prep (Creve Coeur, Missouri)
- College: NC State (2018–2022)
- NBA draft: 2022: undrafted
- Playing career: 2022–present

Career history
- 2022: Promitheas Patras
- 2022: Birmingham Squadron
- 2022–2023: Stockton Kings
- 2023: Lavrio
- 2023–2024: BCH Garid
- 2024: Piratas de Los Lagos
- 2024–2025: Vëllaznimi
- 2025–2026: Zalaegerszeg
- 2026: Toros Laguna
- 2026–present: Bora

Career highlights
- Liga Unike champion (2025)

Jericole Hellems (born October 6, 1999) is an American professional basketball player for Bora of the Kosovo Basketball Superleague. He played college basketball for the NC State Wolfpack of the Atlantic Coast Conference (ACC).

== High school career ==
Hellems played basketball for Chaminade College Preparatory School in Creve Coeur, Missouri. As a junior, he averaged 22 points, seven rebounds and three assists per game. In his senior season, Hellems averaged 23 points, eight rebounds and three assists per game, leading his team to a Class 5 runner-up finish, and received Metro Catholic Conference Player of the Year honors. He scored the third-most points in school history, behind Bradley Beal and Jayson Tatum. A consensus four-star recruit, he committed to playing college basketball for NC State over offers from South Carolina, Arkansas, Florida, Virginia Tech and Georgia Tech.

== College career ==
As a freshman at North Carolina State University Hellems appeared in all 36 games. He averaged 5.3 points and 2.5 rebounds per game. He led the team in steals twice and blocks twice. He scored in double figures in six games.

During his sophomore year, he appeared in 31 games, making 17 starts. Hellems averaged 9.5 points and 3.4 rebounds per game. He finished third on the team with 34 three pointers. He led the team in scoring four times, rebounding four times, steals four times and assists once.

As a junior, Hellems was Honorable Mention All-ACC selection. He appeared in 25 games and made 24 starts. He was one of only two NC State players to appear in every game. He averaged 12.9 points and 5 rebounds per game. He was second on the team in scoring and third on the team in assists. He hit 31 three pointers, second most on the team, and led the team in three point field goal percentage at 38.3 percent.

His senior year, Hellems started all 32 games. He was one of only two players along with Dereon Seabron to start and play in every game. He averaged 13.7 points and 4.6 rebounds per game. He was third on the team in scoring and second in rebounding. He hit 73 three pointers, second most on the team and shot 39 percent from long range. He ranked fourth in the ACC in free throw percentage.

Hellems finished his college career with 1,244 points, 160 three pointers made, 469 rebounds, 142 assists and 96 steals. 55th player in the program history to record 1,000 career points and was 38th on career scoring list when career ended.

On April 1, 2022, Hellems made the decision to pursue a professional career and not return to college even though he had an extra year of eligibility to return to NC State.

== Professional career ==
=== Boston Celtics (2022) ===
Hellems participated in the 2022 NBA Summer League team for the Boston Celtics.

=== ASP Promitheas Patras (2022) ===
On July 31, 2022, Hellems signed his first professional contract overseas with Promitheas Patras.

=== Oklahoma City Blue (2022) ===
On October 22, 2022, the Oklahoma City Blue selected Hellems in Round 1 with Pick 5 in the 2022 Annual NBA G League Draft. On November 1, 2022, the Blue placed Hellems contract on waivers.

=== Birmingham Squadron (2022) ===
On November 9, 2022, the Birmingham Squadron claimed Hellems from the player pool. On November 12, 2022, his contract was placed on waivers.

=== Stockton Kings (2022-2023) ===
On December 3, 2022, the Stockton Kings claimed Hellems from the player pool. On December 6, 2023, the Kings agreed to trade the returning player rights to Hellems to the Sioux Falls Skyforce. On January 24, 2023, the Kings placed his contract on waivers and then on January 28, 2023, he was claimed again from the player pool.

=== GS Lavrio Aegean Cargo (2023) ===
On August 2, 2023, Hellems signed with G.S. Lavrio B.C. of the Greek Basketball League.

=== BCH Garid Ulaanbaatar (2024) ===
On December 11, 2023, Hellems signed with BCH Garid Ulaanbaatar.

=== Piratas de Los Lagos (2024) ===
On May 28, 2024, Hellems signed with Piratas de Los Lagos.

=== Salt Lake City Stars (2024) ===
On October 26, 2024, Hellems joined the Salt Lake City Stars after being selected in the 2024 NBA G League draft, but was waived five days later.

=== Zalakeramia ZTE KK (2025) ===
On June 17, 2025, Hellems joined ZTE KK. In November 2025, Hellems was released from ZTE KK after a home loss.

=== KB Bora (2026) ===
On July 14, 2026 Hellems decided to join KB Bora but he played only five games. On November 10, 2026 Bora has announced that Jericole Hellems had left the team.

== Personal life ==
Hellems is the son of Elizabeth Squibb and Torano Hellems. He has an older brother, Torano.

== Career statistics ==
=== College ===
Year	Team	GP	GS	MPG	FG%	3P%	FT%	RPG	APG	SPG	BPG	PPG
2018–19	NC State	36	0	13.7	.386	.319	.750	2.5	.7	.4	.3	5.3
2019–20	NC State	31	17	25.5	.404	.330	.779	3.4	1.0	.6	.3	9.5
2020–21	NC State	25	24	31.5	.452	.383	.771	5.0	1.8	1.1	.2	12.9
2021–22	NC State	32	32	34.4	.389	.388	.843	4.6	1.3	1.1	.5	13.7
Career		124	73	25.6	.408	.364	.797	3.8	1.2	.8	.3	10.0
