= KK Madžari =

Madzari
- Location: Skopje, North Macedonia
- Team colors: Green and White
Home	Away

KK Madzari is a basketball club based in Skopje, North Macedonia. They play in the Macedonian First League.

== ROSTER ==
01 (United States) Javon Greene
03 (United States) Tommie Lewis
05 (North Macedonia) Alek Petkoski
07 (North Macedonia) Marko Sibinovski
09 (Serbia) Jovan Savić
12 (North Macedonia) Amar Hot
23 (North Macedonia) Marko Lukanoski
24 (North Macedonia) Ivica Dimcevski
25 (North Macedonia) Oliver Dvojakovski
35 (United States) Terry Armstrong

Coach: Miodrag Todorovik
