= Rezart Memedi =

Macedonian-Kosovan basketball player

No. 7 – Bora
- Position: Shooting guard
- League: Kosovo Superleague

Personal information
- Born: 1 May 2003 (age 23) Skopje, Macedonia
- Listed height: 1.93 m (6 ft 4 in)

Career information
- Playing career: 2017–present

Career history
- 2017–2020: Shkupi
- 2020–2022: Aurora Basket Jesi
- 2022–2023: Prishtina
- 2023–2024: Golden Eagle Ylli
- 2024–present: Bora

Career highlights
- Kosovo Supercup winner (2022)

Rezart Memedi (Albanian: Rrezart Mehmedi, born 1 May 2003) is a Macedonian-Kosovan professional basketball player for Bora of the Kosovo Basketball Superleague.

== Professional career ==
On the 18 July 2023, Memedi signed for Golden Eagle Ylli of the Kosovo Superleague.

On the 26 May 2024, he signed for Bora.
