= Predrag Pajić =

Macedonian basketball player

Akademija FMP
- Position: Shooting guard
- League: Macedonian First League

Personal information
- Born: January 20, 1993 (age 33) Skopje, Macedonia
- Listed height: 1.98 m (6 ft 6 in)

Career information
- Playing career: 2011–present

Career history
- 2011–2014: Vardar
- 2014–2019: Feni Industries
- 2019–2022: Kožuv
- 2022: Pelister
- 2022–present: Akademija FMP

Predrag Pajić (born January 20, 1993) is a Macedonian professional basketball Shooting guard who currently plays for Akademija FMP in the Macedonian First League.
