= Cedrick Bowen =

American and Icelandic basketball player

Valur
- Position: Forward
- League: Úrvalsdeild karla

Personal information
- Born: September 5, 1992 (age 34) Marietta, Georgia, U.S.
- Listed height: 6 ft 5 in (1.96 m)
- Listed weight: 232 lb (105 kg)

Career information
- High school: Woodstock (Woodstock, Georgia)
- College: Charleston Southern (2011–2015)
- Playing career: 2015–present

Career history
- 2015–2016: Studentski centar
- 2016–2017: KR
- 2017: Haukar
- 2017: Spartak Pleven
- 2017–2018: Academic Plovdiv
- 2018: Blokotehna
- 2018–2019: Šiauliai
- 2019–2020: Academic Plovdiv
- 2020–2024: Álftanes
- 2024–2026: Ármann
- 2026–present: Valur

Career highlights
- 1. deild karla winner (2023)

Cedrick Taylor Bowen (born September 5, 1992) is an American and Icelandic basketball player for Valur. He played college basketball at Charleston Southern Buccaneers from 2011 to 2015.

== College career ==
Bowen played for Charleston Southern University from 2011 to 2015. In 31 games during his senior year, he averaged 7.9 points and 4.1 rebounds.

== Professional career ==
After graduating, on October 15, 2015, Bowen signed with Studentski Centar Podgorica from Montenegro.

He signed with reigning Icelandic champions KR Basket prior to the 2016–17 Úrvalsdeild karla season. In end of January 2017, the club released him after averaging 13.2 points and 6.8 rebounds per game in 13 games. On February 3, 2017 he signed with rival Úrvalsdeild club Haukar from Hafnarfjörður for the rest of the season as a backup for Finnur Atli Magnússon and Sherrod Wright. In six games for the club, he averaged 5.7 points, 3.8 rebounds and 1.2 assists.

On August 30, 2017, he signed with Spartak Pleven. On December 8, 2017, he signed with Academic Plovdiv but after one month he part ways with the Bulgarian club. On January 7, 2018, he signed with Macedonian basketball club Blokotehna. On January 13, 2018, he made his debut for Blokotehna, scoring 14 points and eight rebounds in a 91–54 win over the Kožuv. In his first match for Blokotehna in BIBL he scored 12 points and six rebounds in a 75–91 away win against Bashkimi Prizren.

In July 2020, Bowen signed with 1. deild karla club Álftanes. In 2023, he won the 1. deild with Álftanes and subsequently played with the team in the top-tier Úrvalsdeild karla the following season.

In 2024, Bowen signed with Ármann. In 2025, he helped Ármann gain promotion to the top-tier Úrvalsdeild karla for the first time in 45-years.

== Personal life ==
Since moving to Iceland, Bowen has become known for his comedic videos on social media.

Bowen received an Icelandic citizenship in July 2025.

== Acting ==
In 2023, Bowen had a small role in the Icelandic TV comedy series IceGuys. In 2025, he appeared in the Áramótaskaup, the annual Icelandic television comedy special, broadcast on New Year's Eve by the state public service broadcaster RÚV.
