= KB Bora =

Professional basketball club in Kosovo

- Leagues: Kosovo Basketball Superleague
- Founded: 2022; 4 years ago
- Arena: 1 Tetori
- Capacity: 3000
- Location: Pristina, Kosovo
- President: Elvedin Plakiq
- Head coach: Lyubomir Minchev
- Team captain: Amin Hot
Home	Away

KB Bora is a professional basketball club based in Pristina, Kosovo. The club currently plays in the Kosovo Basketball Superleague.

== History ==
KB Bora was founded in 2022 in Kosovo's capital Pristina. In 2023, Bora won the Kosovo First League and promoted to the Kosovo Superleague.

== Current roster ==
Note: Flags indicate national team eligibility at FIBA-sanctioned events. Players may hold other non-FIBA nationalities not displayed.

Bora roster
Players
Coaches

Pos.	No.	Nat.	Name	Ht.	Age
G	2	(United States)	Allen, Terrell	1.90 m (6 ft 3 in)	29 – 12 April 1997
SG	3	(Kosovo)	Ismajli, Jon	1.95 m (6 ft 5 in)	20 – 23 December 2005
G	5	(United States)	Wheeler, Jamari	1.85 m (6 ft 1 in)	28 – 9 December 1997
F	6	(Kosovo)	Ukaj, Rron	2.01 m (6 ft 7 in)	26 – 10 September 2000
SG	7	(North Macedonia) (Kosovo)	Memedi, Rezart	1.93 m (6 ft 4 in)	23 – 1 May 2003
G	11	(Kosovo)	Kurtaj, Olsi	1.95 m (6 ft 5 in)	22 – 11 May 2004
F/C	12	(United States) (Nigeria)	Oke, Laolu	2.03 m (6 ft 8 in)	26 – 6 July 2000
F	23	(Kosovo)	Janjeva, Muhamedali	2.01 m (6 ft 7 in)	27 – 28 December 1998
SG	25	(United States)	Dingle, Jordan	1.90 m (6 ft 3 in)	26 – 14 July 2000
G	34	(Kosovo)	Hot, Amin	1.95 m (6 ft 5 in)	34 – 27 March 1992
F/C	35	(Kosovo)	Lebovci, Halim	2.03 m (6 ft 8 in)	18 – 8 August 2008
PF	77	(Kosovo)	Rugova, Fisnik	2.08 m (6 ft 10 in)	37 – 26 August 1989
F	99	(United States)	Hellems, Jericole	2.01 m (6 ft 7 in)	26 – 6 October 1999

Head coach

- (Bulgaria) Lyubomir Minchev

Assistant coach(es)

- (Kosovo) Lorik Kllokoqi

Legend

- (C) Team captain
- Injured

== Notable players ==
Note: Flags indicate national team eligibility at FIBA-sanctioned events. Players may hold other non-FIBA nationalities not displayed.

Criteria

To appear in this section a player must have either:

- Set a club record or won an individual award while at the club
- Played at least one official international match for their national team at any time
- Played at least one official NBA match at any time.

- (United States) Tyler Cheese
- (United States) Alex Hunter
- (United States) Shaquan Jules
- (United States) Lance Thomas
- (North Macedonia) Rezart Mehmedi
- (North Macedonia) Adem Mekić
- (North Macedonia) Jetmir Zeqiri
- (Turkey) Gökhan Şirin
- (Kosovo) Amin Hot
- (Kosovo) Olsi Kurtaj
- (Kosovo) Rron Ukaj

== Coaching history ==
Coach	Years active
(Kosovo) Arben Krasniqi	2022–2024
(Kosovo) Lorik Kllokoqi	2024 (caretaker)
(Montenegro) Danilo Rakočević	2024

| (Montenegro) Zoran Kaśćelan - Present 2026
