= Andrej Cvetkovski =

Macedonian basketball player

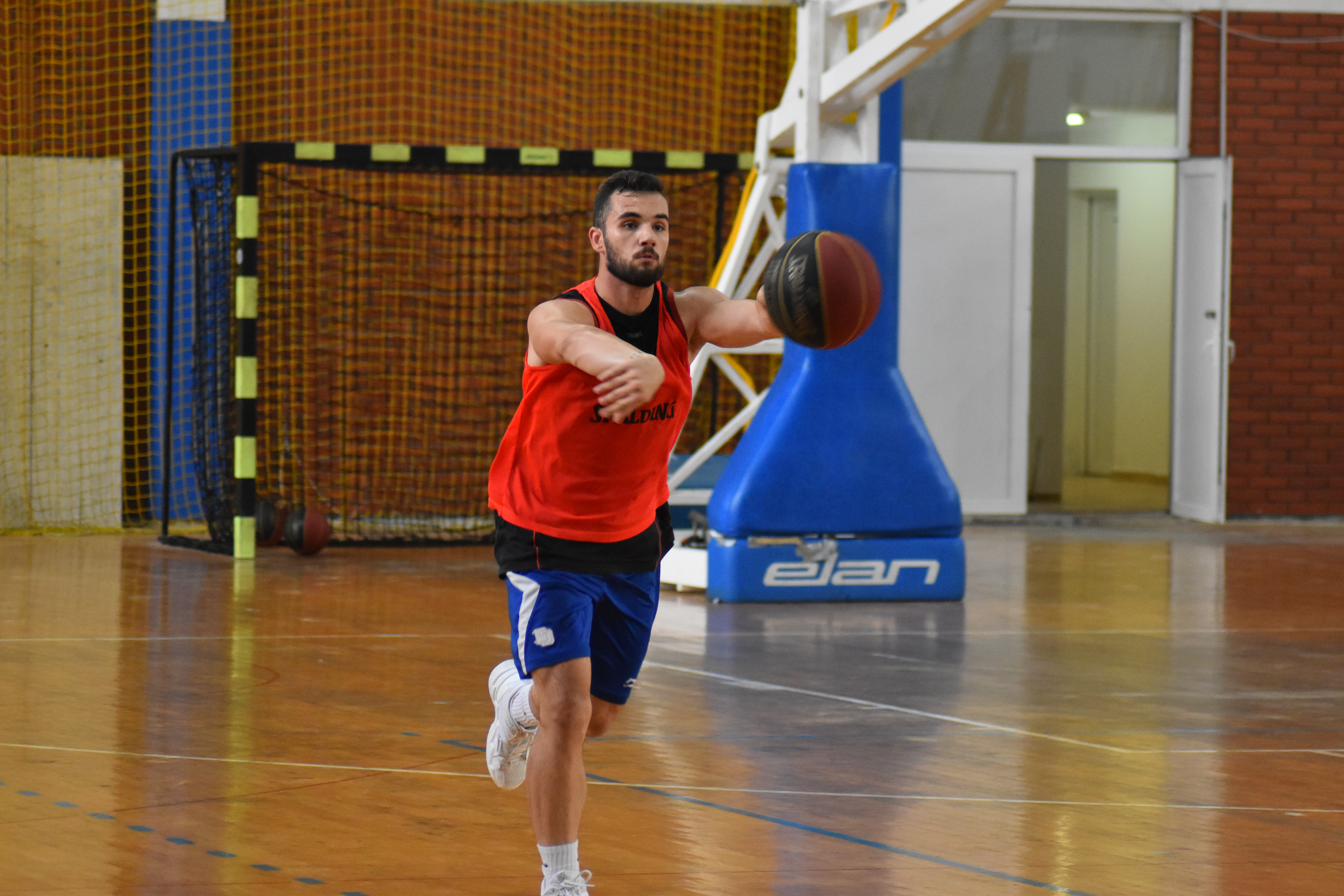

Personal information
- Born: September 20, 1996 (age 30) Skopje, Macedonia
- Listed height: 1.92 m (6 ft 4 in)

Career information
- Playing career: 2013–present
- Position: Point guard

Career history
- 2013–2015: MZT Skopje
- 2015–2016: Rabotnički
- 2016: MZT Skopje
- 2016–2017: Kožuv
- 2017: Radoviš
- 2017–2018: Blokotehna
- 2019: Vardar
- 2019–2020: Pelister
- 2020: Kumanovo
- 2020–2021: Vardar
- 2021: EuroNickel 2005
- 2021–2022: Gostivar

Andrej Cvetkovski (born September 20, 1996) is a Macedonian professional basketball point guard who last played for Gostivar in the Macedonian First League.

== Professional career ==
=== KK MZT Skopje (2013–2015) ===
Coming up to seniors from MZT Skopje's own youth at the age of 17 Andrej had much inspiration. Training with the seniors along with Aleksandar Kostoski, Nikola Otašević, Aleksandar Ćapin and Aleksandar Cvetković among other playing holding the point guard spot within two years spent with the white and blues. Treasuring his limited appearance in the first team Andrej managed to hold the position in the youth squad as one of the leaders dominating in U-20 league along with Ljubomir Mladenovski, Adem Mekić and Mihajlo Arsoski under the eye of coaches Vrbica Stefanov and Vladimir Mirkovski winning nearly everything that the club can win in youth league.

=== KK Rabotnicki Skopje (2015–2016) ===
Not establishing a position in the rotation as a young player among with "giants" plus having MZT Skopje playing in ABA League using a roster of foreign players, Andrej took a turn to seek for his First league minutes at the eternal rivals Rabotnički Skopje having what not to learn from a player with a huge pedigree Dimitar Mirakovski and one of the top Macedonian coaches Marin Dokuzovski. Playing a significant role mostly starting off the bench Andrej scoring 2.6 points, 1.6 rebounds and 0.5 assists per game in 11 minutes on the court. Struggling with the budget the team finished sixth on the table behind leaders MZT Skopje, Karposh Sokoli, Kumanovo, Feni Industries and Kozuv in the regular season, making it to the playoffs where they faced Kumanovo at the quarter-finals.

=== KK MZT Skopje (2016) ===
"Lousy coming back home". Starting the preseason training with his youth team Andrej signs a two-year contract with MZT Skopje on 24 August having the opportunity to play among Dutch national team playmaker Charlon Kloof.

=== KK Kumanovo (2020) ===
On February 11, 2020, Cvetkovski signed with Kumanovo in the Macedonian First League.

=== KK Gostivar (2021–present) ===
On September 29, 2021, Cvetkovski signed with KK Gostivar in the Macedonian First League.
