= Gökhan Şirin =

Turkish basketball player (born 1990)

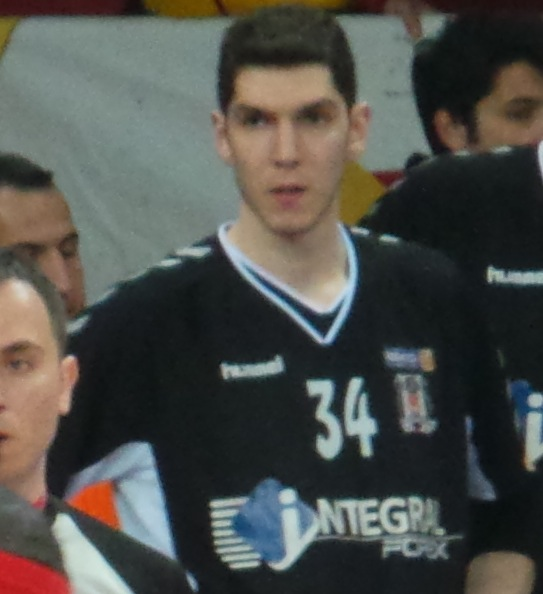

No. 34 – Bora
- Position: Forward
- League: Kosovo Basketball Superleague

Personal information
- Born: September 18, 1990 (age 36) Istanbul, Turkey
- Listed height: 6 ft 10 in (2.08 m)
- Listed weight: 225 lb (102 kg)

Career information
- High school: St. Mary's Ryken (Leonardtown, Maryland)
- College: Charlotte (2009–2011)
- Playing career: 2006–present

Career history
- 2006–2008: Darüşşafaka S.K.
- 2011–2013: Anadolu Efes
- 2013–2014: Beşiktaş
- 2014–2015: Royal Halı Gaziantep
- 2016: Yeşilgiresun Belediye
- 2017: Türk Telekom
- 2017–2019: Ankara DSİ
- 2019–2020: Torku Konyaspor
- 2020–2021: İTÜ Basket
- 2021–2023: Gemlik
- 2023–2024: OGM Ormanspor
- 2024–present: Bora

Osman Gökhan Şirin (born September 18, 1990) is a Turkish basketball player who plays for KB Bora of the Kosovo Basketball Superleague.

After two years with Anadolu Efes S.K., during 2013 summer Şirin signed a contract with Beşiktaş.
