= Petar Nikolić =

Macedonian basketball player

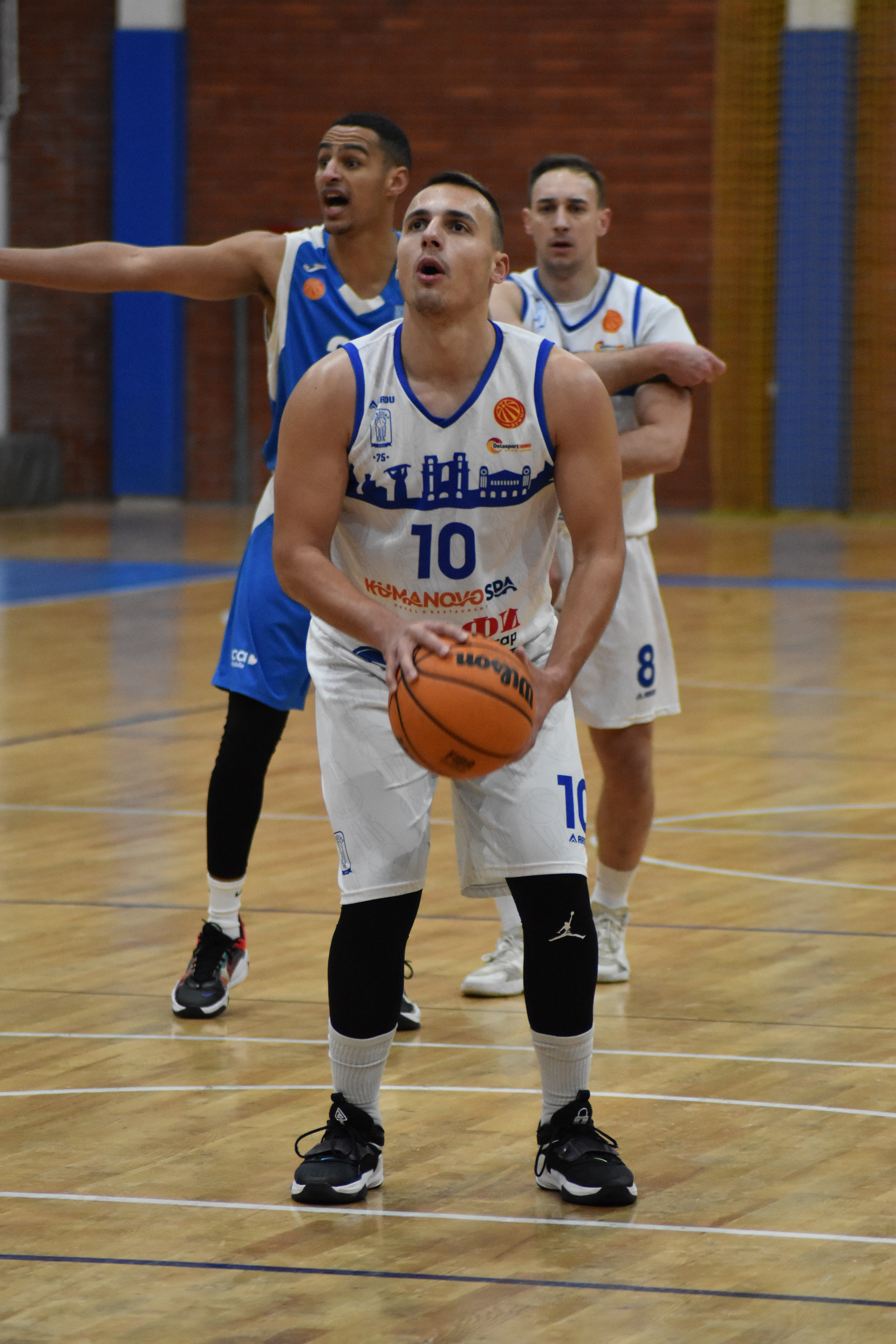

Personal information
- Born: September 25, 1993 (age 33) Macedonia

Career information
- Playing career: 2014–2024
- Position: Guard

Career history
- 2014–2015: Vodnjanski Lisici
- 2015–2018: Rabotnički
- 2018–2019: Blokotehna
- 2019–2020: EuroNickel 2005
- 2020–2021: Rabotnički
- 2021: Pelister
- 2021–2022: Kumanovo
- 2023–2024: Panteri Vranje

Career highlights
- Macedonian League champion (2018)

Petar Nikolić (born September 25, 1993) is a former Macedonian professional basketball Guard.
