= KB Çair 2030 =

- Leagues: Macedonian First League
- Founded: 2016
- Arena: Shaban Terstena Sport Hall
- Location: Skopje, North Macedonia
- Team colors: Blue, White and Red
- President: Mustaf Livareka
- Head coach: Erhan Ramadani
- Assistant: Erkam Ismaili
Home	Away

KB Çair 2030 is a basketball club based in Skopje, North Macedonia. Çair 2030 competes in the Macedonian First League.

== History ==
KB Çair 2030 was founded in 2016 in Çair. In 2022, Çair 2030 debuted in the Macedonian First League in a victory against Kumanovo. In the 2023–24 season they finished fourth making it for the first time in the play-offs.

== Notable players ==
- (Kosovo) (North Macedonia) Valmir Kakruki
- (Kosovo) (North Macedonia) Arbin Rushiti
- (Bosnia and Herzegovina) Nedim Mustafica
- (United States) Brevin Galloway
- (United States) Davell Roby
