= KK Crn Drim =

- Leagues: Macedonian First League
- History: –2003 Crn Drim; 2003–2004 MM Koledz; 2004–2005 FON; 2005–present Crn Drim
- Location: Struga, North Macedonia
- Team colors: Black and White
- President: Dragan Keleshoski
- Head coach: Petar Čočoroski
- Website: https://www.facebook.com/kkcrndrim/
Home	Away

KK Crn Drim Green Mobile (Macedonian: КК Црн Дрим Грин Мобил) is a Macedonian basketball club based in Struga, North Macedonia.

== History ==
Crn Drim as a club based in Struga, is famous as one of the most popular clubs in Southwest part of Macedonia. During the last decades it has promoted huge number of young talents.

Their first appearance in first tier was in 2003–2004 season, when KK Ohrid 98 refused the offer to get the wild card to compete in First League, and Crn Drim filled the place. In their first season in first tier, they changed the name to MM Koledz because of sponsorship of the fellow college and they finished on 7th place in the regular season and secured place for the next season. In the 2004–2005 season, FON University became sponsor of the team and it was named KK FON and it was the best season team from Struga ever had. They finished 5th in the regular season and after the super league they finished 4th and secured place in play-off. In the play-off semifinal they won first game against the first team after the regular season and super league Feršped Rabotnički, but lost next two games and were eliminated. In the 2005–2006 season, Crn Drim has finished on the 7th place in the regular season, but after the play-out phase they were eliminated to Macedonian Second League.

After 14 years competing in Macedonian Second League and Macedonian Third League, in the 2019–2020 season, Crn Drim was placed at first place in the Macedonian Second League when the season was suspended because of the COVID-19 pandemic. The Basketball Federation has decided to promote them to Macedonian First League.

== Honours ==
Macedonian Second League (West)

- Winners: 2020 (promoted)

== Current squad ==
KK Crn Drim roster
Players
Coaches

Pos.	No.	Nat.	Name	Ht.		Age
SG	1	(North Macedonia)	Ristevski, Martin			29 – 21 January 1996
G	1	(North Macedonia)	Uzunoski, Dragan	1.88 m (6 ft 2 in)		27 – 23 September 1997
PG	3	(North Macedonia)	Canoski, Ernes			23 – 24 September 2001
	4	(North Macedonia)	Martinoski, Angel			24 – 7 June 2001
C	6	(France)	Cluysen, Hugo	2.03 m (6 ft 8 in)		26 – 9 November 1998
PG	8	(North Macedonia)	Misa, Damjan	1.91 m (6 ft 3 in)	79 kg (174 lb)	25 – 18 April 2000
PG	10	(North Macedonia)	Nastovski, Andrej	1.93 m (6 ft 4 in)	84 kg (185 lb)	25 – 23 August 2000
PG	11	(United States)	Cowherd, Eljay	1.83 m (6 ft 0 in)	79 kg (174 lb)	28 – 8 February 1997
PG	11	(North Macedonia)	Radičeski, Hristijan			26 – 11 January 1999
C	12	(North Macedonia)	Arsoski, Mihajlo	2.10 m (6 ft 11 in)		29 – 21 September 1995
C	16	(Mali)	Kone, Sidiki	2.11 m (6 ft 11 in)		24 – 21 January 2001
G	23	(North Macedonia)	Lefkoski, Vojče	1.90 m (6 ft 3 in)		34 – 8 March 1991
SG	33	(North Macedonia)	Atanasov, Andrej	1.88 m (6 ft 2 in)		27 – 11 November 1997
G		(United States)	McBride, Trey	1.88 m (6 ft 2 in)	89 kg (196 lb)

Head coach

- (North Macedonia) Petar Čočoroski

Legend

- (C) Team captain
- Injured

- Roster
Updated: 2021-01-13

=== Depth chart ===
Pos.	Starting 5	Bench 1	Bench 2	Bench 3
C	Hugo Cluysen	Sidiki Kone		Titi Papazov
PF	Mihajlo Arsoski		Gabriel Koskoski
SF	Vojče Lefkoski	Andrej Atanasov		Angel Martinoski
SG	Eljay Cowherd	Trey McBride	Martin Ristevski	Hristijan Radičeski
PG	Andrej Nastovski	Damjan Misa	Ernes Canoski	Dragan Uzunoski
