= Marjan Mladenović =

Macedonian basketball player

Marjan Mladenovic
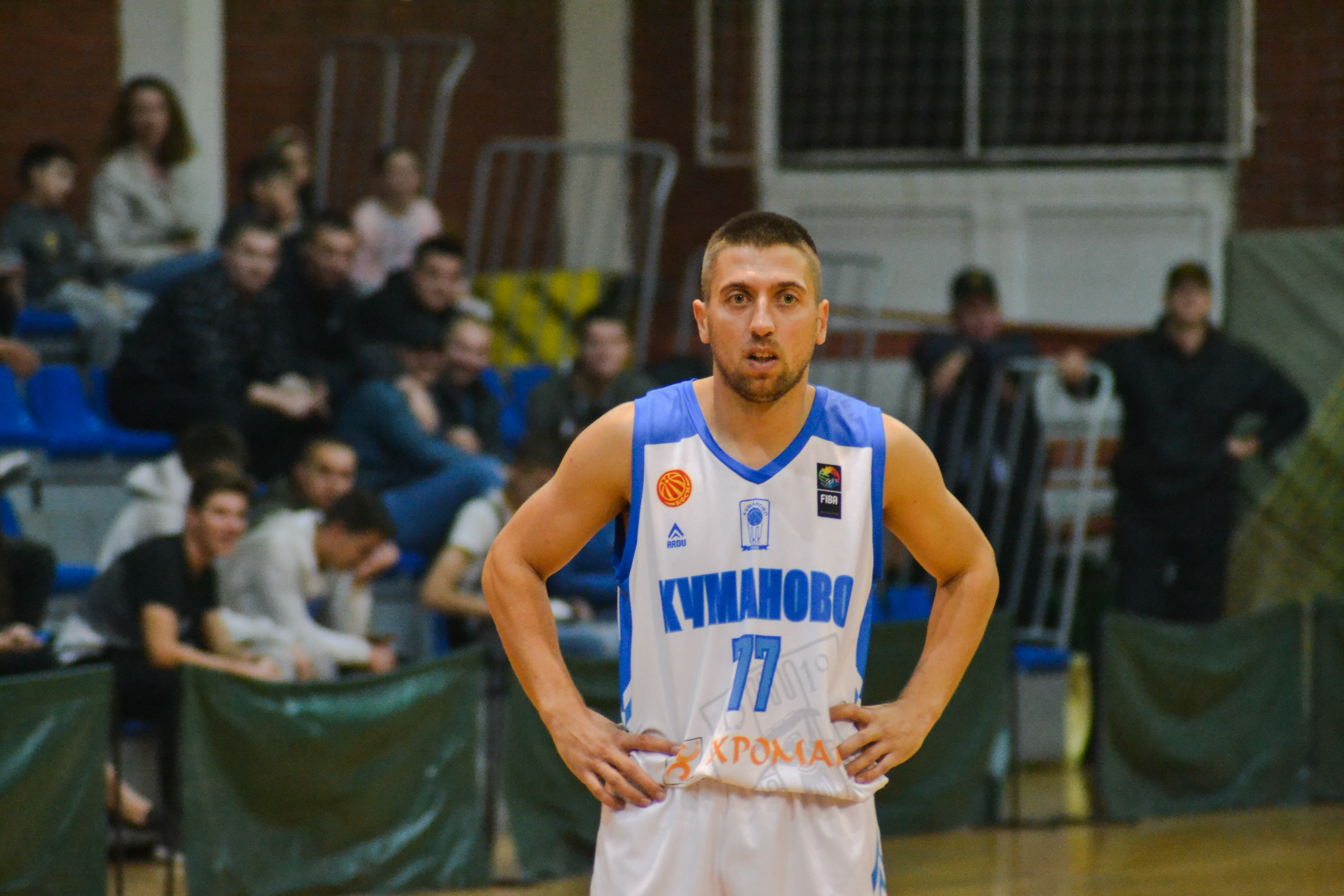

Gostivar
- Position: Point guard
- League: Macedonian First League

Personal information
- Born: August 27, 1987 (age 39) Titov Veles, Macedonia, Yugoslavia
- Listed height: 5 ft 11 in (1.80 m)
- Listed weight: 158 lb (72 kg)

Career information
- Playing career: 2007–present

Career history
- 2007–2009: Ultimejt Basket
- 2009–2011: Ovče Pole
- 2011–2015: Kumanovo
- 2015–2017: AV Ohrid
- 2017: Radoviš
- 2017–2019: Blokotehna
- 2019: AV Ohrid
- 2019: Gostivar
- 2019: Kumanovo
- 2019–2021: Rabotnički
- 2021–2022: Pelister
- 2022–2025: EuroNickel 2005
- 2025–present: Gostivar

Marjan Mladenovic (born August 27, 1987) is a Macedonian professional basketball player who plays for Gostivar.
