= KK Radoviš =

- Leagues: Macedonian Third League
- Founded: 1986
- Arena: SRC 25 Maj
- Location: Radoviš, North Macedonia
- Team colors: Blue and White
- Head coach: Nikola Nikolovski
Home	Away

KK Radoviš is a basketball club based in Radoviš, North Macedonia. They currently play in the Macedonian Third League.

== Squad 2016/2017 ==
KK Radoviš roster
Players
Coaches

Pos.	No.	Nat.	Name	Ht.		Age
PF	4	(North Macedonia)	Gocevski, Zlatko	2.05 m (6 ft 9 in)	93 kg (205 lb)	44 – 9 April 1982
PG	7	(North Macedonia)	Mladenović, Marjan	1.80 m (5 ft 11 in)	72 kg (159 lb)	39 – 27 August 1987
SG	8	(North Macedonia)	Glavčev, Goran	1.91 m (6 ft 3 in)		33 – 19 June 1993
C	9	(North Macedonia)	Avramovski, Siniša	2.08 m (6 ft 10 in)	91 kg (201 lb)	43 – 2 September 1983
PG	12	(North Macedonia)	Cvetkovski, Andrej	1.92 m (6 ft 4 in)		30 – 20 September 1996
G		(North Macedonia)	Nikolov, Milan	1.84 m (6 ft 0 in)		40 – 5 November 1985
PF		(North Macedonia)	Mukaetov, Aleksandar	1.97 m (6 ft 6 in)		38 – 24 December 1987

Head coach

- (North Macedonia) Nikola Nikolovski

Assistant coach(es)

- (North Macedonia)

Legend

- (C) Team captain
- Injured

- Roster
Updated: 2017-02-07
