= KK Blokotehna =

Macedonian basketball club

КК Blokotehna
- Leagues: BIBL; Macedonian First League
- Founded: 2016
- Dissolved: 2019
- Arena: NB NOEL
- Capacity: 450
- Location: Gevgelija, North Macedonia
- President: Dragan Ristov
- Ownership: Tome Glavčev
- Championships: 1 BIBL
Home	Away

KK Blokotehna (Macedonian: КК Блокотехна) is a Macedonian basketball club that was based in Gevgelija, North Macedonia. Established in 2016, they played in the Macedonian First League. After winning the BIBL in its second season, the team was dissolved in 2019.

== History ==
The club was founded in 2016, but it sent their players on loan to Radoviš in the Macedonian Second League. After Radoviš secured a place in the First League, with mutual agreement he transferred his place to Blokotehna. In the season 2017/2018 Blokotehna applied for participation in BIBL. Тhey were eliminated in the semifinals by Levski Lukoil. On April 7, 2019, Blokotehna won for the first time in the history BIBL League trophy beating in the Final Teuta. In season 2018/19 they were hosts of the domestic cup and they played in the Final against Rabotnicki. They made it to the semi-finals in the domestic Championship.

== BIBL League Seasons ==
- 2018: (10-4) 4th
- 2019: (11-3)

== Honours ==
European

- BIBL Champions 2019

== Notable players ==
- (Serbia) Danilo Mijatović
- (Israel) Anton Kazarnovski
- (Lithuania) Povilas Gaidys
- (United States) Dwayne Benjamin
- (United States) Shakir Smith
- (United States) Cedrick Bowen
- (North Macedonia) Marjan Mladenović
- (North Macedonia) Goran Glavčev
- (North Macedonia) Stojan Gjuroski

== Notable coaches ==
- (North Macedonia) Marjan Ilievski
