= KK Akademija FMP =

Basketball club in Skopje, North Macedonia

KK Naviko Akademija FMP
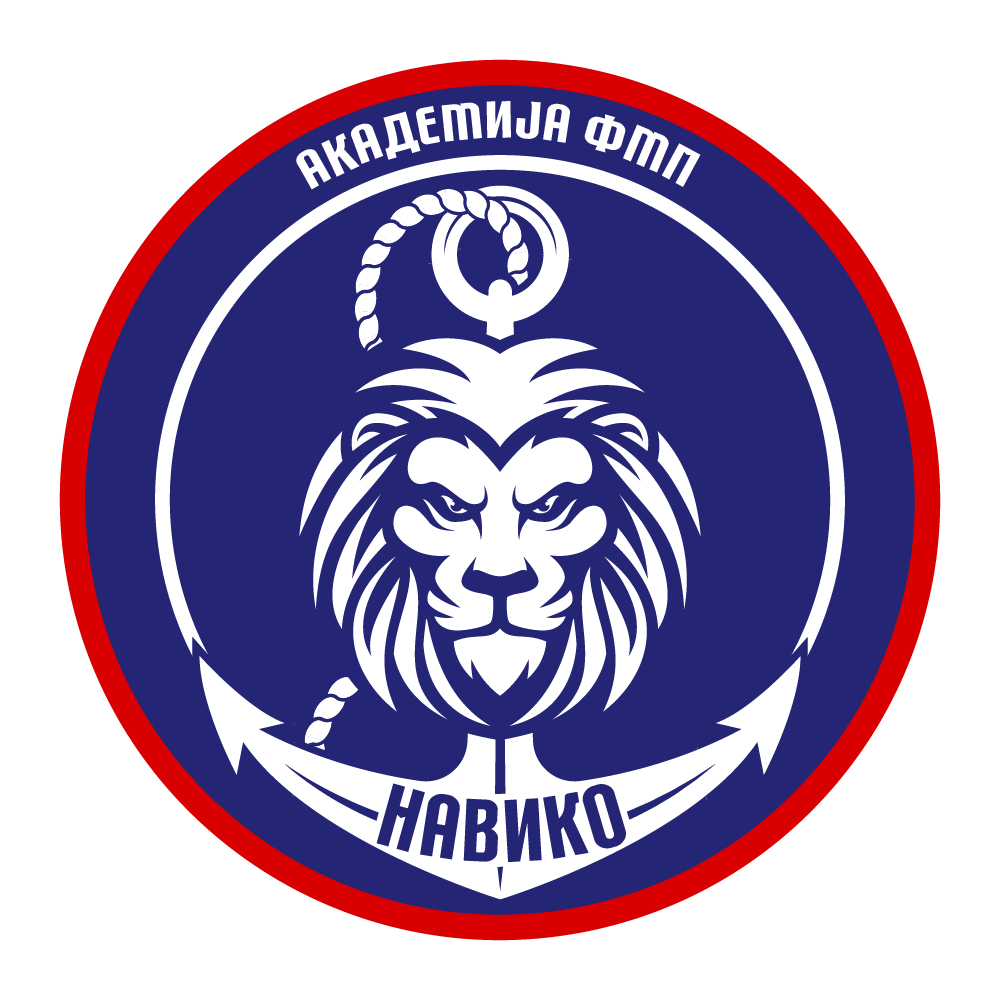
- Leagues: Macedonian League; BIBL League
- Founded: 2013
- Arena: Nezavisna Makedonija
- Capacity: 1000
- Location: Skopje, North Macedonia
- Website: fmp.mk
Home	Away

KK Navico Akademija FMP (Macedonian: КК Навико Академија ФМП) is a Macedonian men's professional basketball club based in Skopje.

== History ==
Founded in 2013, KK Navico Akademija FMP had their first senior team in the 2014–15 season. KK Navico Akademija FMP finished the season second in the Macedonian Third League, a position which allowed them to promote to the Macedonian Second League.

In 2019, the team finished the regular season of Macedonian Second League as the undefeated club in both groups. In the playoffs, they lost in the finals against the MZT Skopje 2.

However, the team won the additional playoff match against the lowest-ranked team in Macedonian First League, Shkupi. KK Navico Akademija FMP was promoted to the Macedonian First League.

The team has been part of the Macedonian First League since the 2019–2020 season. On October 12, 2019, KK Navico Akademija FMP began its journey in the first league with a loss against Gostivar. On November 9, 2019, KK Navico Akademija FMP won against Rabotnički.

In the season 2020/2021 KK Navico Akademija FMP played in the playoffs in Macedonian First League, finishing eighth in the regular season. Also the team qualified in the semi-finals of the Cup of Macedonia in 2021.

The Club grew very fast in the past years and in season 2022 entered the Delasport BIBL league .In the same season they've managed to finish 9th winning 2 games against Levski and Balkan . In the season 2024 they got back to the Delasport BIBL competition.

== Home Ground ==
Akademija FMP's home ground is a small Gym with 1000 seats. Its European matches BC Akademija FMP plays at SRC Kale .

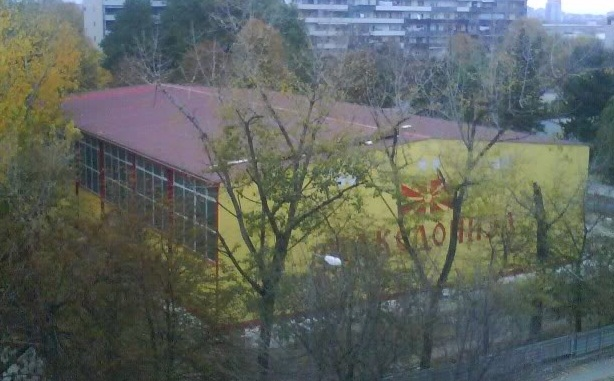
Akademija FMP gym

== Honors ==
Macedonian First League

- Qualified for the playoffs: season 2020/2021

Macedonian Cup

- Qualified in the semifinals: 2021

Macedonian Second League

- Runners-Up: 2019 (promoted)

Macedonian Third League

- Runners-Up - 2015 (promoted)

== BIBL League Seasons ==
- 2022:(2-6) 9th
- 2024:(-) tbd

== Current squad ==
KK Akademija FMP roster
Players
Coaches
>

Pos.	No.	Nat.	Name	Ht.	Age
C		(North Macedonia)	Gruevski, Nikola	2.03 m (6 ft 8 in)	23 – 27 June 2002
PG		(North Macedonia)	Masevski, Nikola	1.83 m (6 ft 0 in)	22 – 10 November 2003
SF		(North Macedonia)	Pajić, Predrag	1.96 m (6 ft 5 in)	33 – 3 January 1993
	6	(North Macedonia)	Nastovski, Andrej
	7	(North Macedonia)	Ivanov, Dimitar
	8	(North Macedonia)	Dimovski, Marko
	9	(North Macedonia)	Petrovski, Luka
	10	(North Macedonia)	Spasovski, Marko

Head coach

- (North Macedonia) Vacant

Assistant coach(es)

- (North Macedonia) Andrea Stojanovski

Legend

- (C) Team captain
- Injured

- Roster

=== Depth chart ===
Pos.	Starting 5	Bench
C		Nikola Gruevski
PF
SF
SG
PG
