= KK MZT Skopje 2 =

Macedonian basketball club

MZT Skopje UNI Banka
- Nickname: Штркови (The Storks); Металци (The Metalworkers)
- Leagues: Macedonian League
- Arena: Jane Sandanski Arena
- Location: Skopje, North Macedonia
- Team colors: Blue and White
- President: Ognen Stojanovski
- Head coach: Bojan Serafimov
- Website: mztskopjeaerodrom.mk
Home	Away

KK MZT Skopje UNI Banka is a basketball club based in Skopje, Macedonia. It is the second team of Macedonian champion MZT Skopje and competes in Macedonian Second League.

== History ==
On August 19, 2019, has been officially announced that the second team of MZT Skopje would participate in the 2019/20 basketball season. On October 10, 2019, it was announced that in the new 2019/20 season the team will participate with new name, KK MZT Skopje UNI Banka. In October 2019, MZT Skopje 2 officially played the first game in the First Macedonian League.

== Players ==
MZT Skopje UNI Banka roster
Players	Coaches
Pos. / No. / Nat. / Name / Ht. / Age	Head coach: (North Macedonia) Bojan Serafimov; Assistant coach(es): (North Macedonia) Stefan Kukanovski; Team manager: (North Macedonia) Ognen Stojanovski; Legend: (C) Team captain; Injured; Roster; Updated: October 28, 2020

=== Depth chart ===
Pos.	Starting 5	Bench 1	Bench 2
C	Viktor Stojkovski	Borjan Angelovski	Nikola Gruevski
PF	Andrej Andonoski	Filip Pandev
SF	Bojan Veličkovski	Marko Spasovski	Hristijan Nastovski
SG	Dimitar Ivanov	Paolo Blazevski
PG	Nikola Vasilevski	Karlo Blazevski	Bojan Stojanovski
