= KB Shkupi =

- Leagues: Macedonian First League
- Founded: 1977
- Arena: SRC Kale (capacity: 4,300)
- Location: Skopje, North Macedonia
- Team colors: Blue and White
- President: Enver Miftari
- Head coach: Enver Miftari
Home	Away

KB Shkupi (Macedonian: КК Шкупи) is a basketball club based in Skopje, North Macedonia. The club is part of the multidisciplinary Shkupi, whose football team is called KF Shkupi.

== History ==
The club was founded in 1977 as KB Slloga Shkup/KK Sloga Skopje.

In 2020, Shkupi expressed the desire to participate in the Liga Unike. However, this was not allowed.

In 2024, Shkupi returned to the Macedonian First League.

== Current roster ==
KK Shkupi roster
Players
Coaches

Pos.	No.	Nat.	Name	Ht.	Age
PF		(United States)	Williams, Daequan	2.03 m (6 ft 8 in)	26 – 18 December 1999
PG		(United States)	Tribble, Greg	1.85 m (6 ft 1 in)	24 – 18 December 2001
SF		(United States)	Archie, Jacorie	1.98 m (6 ft 6 in)	27 – 18 December 1998

Head coach

- (North Macedonia) Toni Simić

Assistant coach(es)

- (North Macedonia) Enver Miftari

Legend

- (C) Team captain
- Injured

== Notable players ==
- (North Macedonia) Siniša Avramovski
- (North Macedonia) (Kosovo) Valmir Kakruki
- (North Macedonia) (Kosovo) Rrezart Mehmedi
- (North Macedonia) (Kosovo) Lejson Zeqiri

== See also ==
- KF Shkupi (football)
