= KK AV Ohrid =

AV Ohrid
- Founded: 2014
- Dissolved: 2019
- Arena: Biljanini Izvori Sports Hall
- Capacity: 4,000
- Location: Ohrid, North Macedonia
- 2019 position: First League, 10th of 11
- Website: http://www.avohrid.com
Home	Away

KK AV Ohrid (Macedonian: КК АВ Охрид) was a basketball club based in Ohrid, North Macedonia. They played in the Macedonian First League from 2014 until 2019.

== History ==
=== Beginnings ===
AV Ohrid was founded in 2015 by Milčo Doneski. The club gained promotion to the Macedonian First League during its inaugural season.

=== Glory Days ===
The club took one of the spots in the 2nd division of the ABA League in the 2017/18 season, its first international appearance.

== Honours ==
- (North Macedonia) Macedonian Second League
  - Winners (1): 2015-16

== Notable players ==
- (North Macedonia) Slobodan Mihajlovski
- (North Macedonia) Branko Janeski
- (North Macedonia) Marjan Mladenović
- (North Macedonia) Stevan Gligorijević
- (North Macedonia) Filip Bakoč
- (North Macedonia) Stefan Mladenović
- (Serbia) Milojko Vasilić
- (Serbia) Saša Đorđević
- (Serbia) Luka Milojević
- (Bosnia and Herzegovina) Emir Zimić
- (Bulgaria) Stanislav Tsonkov
- (United States) Devin Brooks
- (United States) Kaylen Shane
- (United States) Phil Henry
- (United States) KC Ross-Miller
- (Russia) Dmitri Nekrasov
- (Australia) Liam Thomas
- (France) Rémi Barry
- (Croatia) Martin Junaković
- (Kosovo) Mirza Ahmetbašić

== Notable coaches ==
- (North Macedonia) Petar Čočoroski
