= 2015–16 Macedonian First League =

Macedonian First League
- Season: 2015–16
- Duration: October 10, 2015 – April 23, 2016 (Regular season); May–June 2016 (Playoffs)
- Teams: 8
- TV partner(s): Macedonian Radio Television

Regular season
- Top seed: MZT Skopje

Finals
- Champions: MZT Skopje (5th title)
- Runners-up: Kumanovo 2009

The 2015–16 Macedonian First League was the 24th season of the Macedonian First League, with 8 teams participating in it.

Regular season started on October 10, 2015, and finished on April 23, 2016, followed by the playoffs, with the six best placed teams joining it.

== Teams ==
Location of teams in the 2015–16 Macedonian First League

Team	City	Venue	Capacity
Best	Gevgelija	26th April Hall	1,500
Feni Industries	Kavadarci	Jasmin Sports Hall	2,500
Karpoš Sokoli	Skopje	Boris Trajkovski Sports Center	8,000
Kožuv	Gevgelija	26th April Hall	1,500
Kumanovo 2009	Kumanovo	Sports Hall Kumanovo	7,000
MZT Skopje	Skopje	Jane Sandanski Arena	7,500
Rabotnički	Skopje	Gradski Park	2,000
Strumica	Strumica	Sports Hall Park	2,300

Teams that play in the 2015–16 ABA League
Teams that play in the 2015–16 BIBL

=== Personnel and sponsorship ===
Team	Head coach	Captain	Kit manufacturer	Shirt sponsor
MZT Skopje	(North Macedonia) Aleksandar Jončevski	(North Macedonia) Damjan Stojanovski	Li-Ning	Acibaden / Bauer
Rabotnički	(North Macedonia) Marin Dokuzovski	(North Macedonia) Dimitar Mirakovski	Adidas	-
Karpoš Sokoli	(Serbia) Siniša Matić	(North Macedonia) Angel Tasevski	Erreà	-
Feni Industries	(North Macedonia) Ljupčo Malinkov	(North Macedonia) Goran Samardziev	Spalding	FENI Industries
Kumanovo	(North Macedonia) Marjan Srbinovski	(North Macedonia) Aleksandar Kostoski	Dacapo	Hromak / DeLuxe
Strumica	(North Macedonia) Zlatko Zetov	(North Macedonia) Eftim Bogoev	Li-Ning	Maks
Kožuv	(North Macedonia) Marjan Ilievski	(North Macedonia) Vladimir Brckov	Spalding	-
Best	(North Macedonia) Vladimir Mirkovski	(North Macedonia) Nikola Gajdadjiev	Legea	Vantoni

=== Coaching changes ===
Week	Club	Outgoing coach	Date of change	Incoming coach
1st	KK Best	(North Macedonia) Nikola Nikolovski	13 October 2015	(North Macedonia) Micko Aleksovski
7th	KK Kožuv	(North Macedonia) Boban Mitev	11 November 2015	(Greece) Stratos Kukulekidis
9th	KK Kumanovo	(Serbia) Ljubisav Luković	27 November 2015	(North Macedonia) Straso Todorovic
11th	KK MZT Skopje	(Slovenia) Aleš Pipan	7 December 2015	(North Macedonia) Aleksandar Jončevski
17th	KK Best	(North Macedonia) Micko Aleksovski	13 January 2016	(North Macedonia) Vladimir Mirkovski
20th	KK Kožuv	(Greece) Stratos Kukulekidis	4 February 2016	(North Macedonia) Marjan Ilievski
24th	KK Kumanovo	(North Macedonia) Straso Todorovic	25 February 2016	(North Macedonia) Marjan Srbinovski

== Regular season ==
=== Standings ===
Pos	Team	Pld	W	L	PF	PA	PD	Pts	Qualification or relegation
1	MZT Skopje	28	24	4	2326	1888	+438	52	Qualification to semifinals
2	Karpoš Sokoli	28	21	7	2441	2035	+406	49	Qualification to semifinals
3	Kumanovo	28	20	8	2388	2152	+236	48	Qualification to quarterfinals
4	Feni Industries	28	18	10	2278	2088	+190	46	Qualification to quarterfinals
5	Kožuv	28	13	15	2034	2064	−30	41	Qualification to quarterfinals
6	Rabotnički	28	11	17	2115	2165	−50	39	Qualification to quarterfinals
7	Strumica	28	5	23	1879	2367	−488	33	
8	Best	28	0	28	1865	2537	−672	28	Relegated

Source: Macedonian Basketball Federation

== Playoffs ==
In quarterfinals, if one of the teams won the two regular season games against its rival, a first win is awarded in the best-of-five series.

Quarterfinals
4	Feni Industries	W	100	79	82
5	Kožuv	96	91	69
3	Kumanovo	W	82	77	100
6	Rabotnički	85	60	94

Semifinals
1	MZT Aerodrom	95	91	100
4	Feni Industries	64	87	77
2	Karpoš Sokoli	97	63	74	57	73
3	Kumanovo	91	66	65	73	84

Final
1	MZT Aerodrom	84	82	91	90
3	Kumanovo	87	75	73	88

== Individual statistics ==
=== Points ===
Rank	Name	Team	PPG
1.	(United States) Ty Harris	KK Best	21.1
2.	(Serbia) Marko Luković	KK MZT Aerodrom	20.3
3.	(North Macedonia) Bojan Trajkovski	KK Kumanovo	18.3

=== Rebounds ===
Rank	Name	Team	RPG
1.	(Serbia) Uroš Luković	KK MZT Aerodrom	11.1
2.	(North Macedonia) Gjorgji Čekovski	KK Rabotnički	9.8
3.	(Serbia) Marko Marković	KK Best	9.0

=== Assists ===
Rank	Name	Team	APG
1.	(North Macedonia) Aleksandar Kostoski	KK Kumanovo	6.3
2.	(North Macedonia) Dimitar Mirakovski	KK Rabotnički	6.2
3.	(Croatia) Karlo Vragović	KK Feni Industries	5.8

=== Steals ===
Rank	Name	Team	SPG
1.	(United States) C.J. Carter	KK MZT Aerodrom	2.3
2.	(Serbia) Marko Boltić	KK Karpoš Sokoli	2.1
3.	(United States) Brandon Penn	KK Kožuv	2.1

=== Blocks ===
Rank	Name	Team	APG
1.	(Serbia) Uroš Luković	KK Kumanovo	3.1
2.	(Serbia) Nenad Mišanović	KK Kumanovo	1.5
3.	(Montenegro) Žarko Rakočević	KK Kumanovo	1.3

== MVP List ==
=== MVP of the Round ===
Round	Player	Team	Efficiency
1	(Israel) Anton Kazarnovski	KK Karpoš Sokoli	50
2	(Serbia) Uroš Luković	KK Kumanovo	40
3	(Serbia) Uroš Luković	KK Kumanovo	41
4	(Serbia) Uroš Luković	KK Kumanovo	37
5	(Serbia) Đorđe Drenovac	KK MZT Aerodrom	36
6	(Serbia) Uroš Luković	KK Kumanovo	37
7	(Serbia) Đorđe Drenovac	KK MZT Aerodrom	42
8	(North Macedonia) Gjorgji Čekovski	KK Rabotnički	35
9	(Serbia) Đorđe Drenovac	KK MZT Aerodrom	34
10	(Serbia) Đorđe Drenovac	KK MZT Aerodrom	31
11	(North Macedonia) Bojan Trajkovski	KK Kumanovo	49
12	(Serbia) Nenad Mišanović	KK Kumanovo	38
13	(Croatia) Karlo Vragović	KK Feni Industries	37
14	(Croatia) Karlo Vragović	KK Feni Industries	36
15	(Croatia) Karlo Vragović	KK Feni Industries	41
16	(North Macedonia) Gjorgji Čekovski	KK Rabotnički	28
17	(Croatia) Karlo Vragović	KK Feni Industries	35
18	(Serbia) Dragan Tubak	KK Feni Industries	26
19	(Croatia) Karlo Vragović	KK Feni Industries	28
20	(North Macedonia) Kiril Nikolovski	KK Feni Industries	36
21	(Croatia) Karlo Vragović	KK Feni Industries	45
22	(North Macedonia) Bojan Trajkovski	KK Kumanovo	33
23	(North Macedonia) Dimitar Mirakovski	KK Rabotnički	36
24	(North Macedonia) Kiril Nikolovski	KK Feni Industries	27
25	(North Macedonia) Gjorgji Čekovski	KK Rabotnički	48
26	(North Macedonia) Gjorgji Čekovski	KK Rabotnički	39
27	(North Macedonia) Dimitar Mirakovski	KK Rabotnički	38
28	(Croatia) Karlo Vragović	KK Feni Industries	52

== Macedonian clubs in European competitions ==
Team	Competition	Progress	Result
KK MZT Aerodrom	2015–16 ABA League	ABA League	8th place
KK Kumanovo	2015–16 FIBA Europe Cup	Regular Season Group J	4th place
KK Kožuv	2015–16 BIBL season	Balkan League	Semifinal
