= 2010–11 FC Barcelona Bàsquet season =

Spanish basketball club season

Regal FC Barcelona
2010–11 season
- Chairman: Sandro Rosell
- Head coach: Xavi Pascual
- Arena: Palau Blaugrana
- Euroleague: Quarterfinals
- ACB: Winners
- Copa del Rey: Winners
- Supercopa: Winners
- Highest home attendance: 7,411 vs Real Madrid (30 December 2010)
- Biggest win: 84–44 vs Menorca Bàsquet (31 October 2010)
- Biggest defeat: 78–67 vs Panathinaikos (31 March 2011)
Home	Away

The 2010–11 season of FC Barcelona Bàsquet was the 46th season of the club in the highest division of Spanish basketball and the 28th season in the Liga ACB.

In the 2010–11 season, FC Barcelona competed in the Liga ACB, the Supercopa, the Copa del Rey and the EuroLeague.

== Players ==
=== Roster ===
Note: Flags indicate national team eligibility at FIBA-sanctioned events. Players may hold other non-FIBA nationalities not displayed.

Regal FC Barcelona roster
Players
Coaches

Pos.	No.	Nat.	Name	Ht.	Wt.	Age
G	5	(Italy)	Basile, Gianluca	1.92 m (6 ft 4 in)	95 kg (209 lb)	36 – 24 January 1975
PG	8	(Spain)	Sada, Víctor	1.92 m (6 ft 4 in)	93 kg (205 lb)	27 – 8 March 1984
PG	9	(Spain)	Rubio, Ricky	1.89 m (6 ft 2 in)	86 kg (190 lb)	20 – 21 October 1990
PG	10	(Slovenia)	Lakovič, Jaka	1.86 m (6 ft 1 in)	95 kg (209 lb)	32 – 9 July 1978
SG	11	(Spain)	Navarro, Juan Carlos	1.92 m (6 ft 4 in)	90.5 kg (200 lb)	31 – 13 June 1980
C	13	(Serbia)	Perović, Kosta	2.17 m (7 ft 1 in)	118 kg (260 lb)	26 – 19 February 1985
C	17	(Spain)	Vázquez, Fran	2.08 m (6 ft 10 in)	105 kg (231 lb)	28 – 1 May 1983
G/F	20	(Australia)	Ingles, Joe	2.03 m (6 ft 8 in)	100 kg (220 lb)	23 – 2 October 1987
C	21	(Senegal)	N'Dong, Boniface	2.13 m (7 ft 0 in)	111 kg (245 lb)	33 – 3 September 1977
PF	23	(United States)	Morris, Terence	2.06 m (6 ft 9 in)	109 kg (240 lb)	32 – 11 January 1979
PF/C	25	(Slovenia)	Lorbek, Erazem	2.08 m (6 ft 10 in)	113 kg (249 lb)	27 – 21 February 1984
G/F	32	(United States)	Anderson, Alan	1.98 m (6 ft 6 in)	100 kg (220 lb)	28 – 16 October 1982
SF	33	(United States)	Mickeal, Pete	2.01 m (6 ft 7 in)	109 kg (240 lb)	33 – 22 February 1978
G/F	44	(Spain)	Grimau, Roger (C)	1.96 m (6 ft 5 in)	95 kg (209 lb)	32 – 14 July 1978

Head coach

- (Spain) Xavier Pascual

Assistant coach(es)

- (Spain) Agustín Julbé
- (Spain) Iñigo Zorzano
- (Spain) David García

Legend

- (C) Team captain
- Injured

- Roster

=== Depth chart ===
Pos.	Starting 5	Bench 1	Bench 2
C	Fran Vázquez †	Boniface N'Dong	Kosta Perović
PF	Erazem Lorbek	Terence Morris *
SF	Pete Mickeal *	Joe Ingles	Roger Grimau †
SG	Juan Carlos Navarro †	Alan Anderson *	Gianluca Basile
PG	Ricky Rubio †	Víctor Sada †	Jaka Lakovič

Notes: Blue † – homegrown player; Red * – overseas player; Green ‡ – youth player

=== In ===
No.	Pos.	Nat.	Name	Age	Moving from		Type	Ends	Transfer fee	Date	Source
13	C	(Serbia)	Kosta Perović	25	Valencia Basket	(Spain)	Parted ways	2013	–	28 June 2010	
20	G/F	(Australia)	Joe Ingles	23	Granada	(Spain)	Contract buyout	2013	425,000€	15 November 2010	
32	G/F	(United States)	Alan Anderson	28	New Mexico Thunderbirds	(United States)	Parted ways	2011	–	20 December 2010	

=== Out ===
No.	Pos.	Nat.	Name	Age	Moving to		Type	Transfer fee	Date	Source
13	SF	(Czech Republic)	Luboš Bartoň	30	Fuenlabrada	(Spain)	Parted ways	–	1 July 2010	
8	PF	(Spain)	Jordi Trias	29	Joventut Badalona	(Spain)	Parted ways	–	19 August 2010	

== Pre-season and friendlies ==
=== Friendly matches ===
29 August 2010	Regal FC Barcelona	86–57	CAI Zaragoza	Sant Julià de Vilatorta
	Scoring by quarter: 20–7, 15–18, 26–14, 25–18
	Pts: Sada 13	Report	Pts: Aguilar 12	Arena: Pavelló Esportiu Municipal; Referees: Xavier Amorós, Anna Cardús, Juan Carlos Mitjana

4 September 2010	River Andorra	70–80	Regal FC Barcelona	Encamp
	Scoring by quarter: 12–21, 19–19, 16–21, 23–19
	Pts: Johnson 14	Report	Pts: N'Dong 17	Arena: Complex Esportiu i Sociocultural; Attendance: 400

8 September 2010	Gran Canaria 2014	81–76	Regal FC Barcelona	Las Palmas
18:30
				Arena: Centro Insular de Deportes

11 September 2010	DKV Joventut	78–85	Regal FC Barcelona	Platja d'Aro
18:00
				Arena: Palau d'Esports i Congressos

29 September 2010	Regal FC Barcelona	92–56	Assignia Manresa	Tortosa
20:30
				Arena: Pavelló de Ferreries

7 October 2010	Regal FC Barcelona	92–88	Los Angeles Lakers	Barcelona
20:30	Scoring by quarter: 21–24, 24–20, 23–26, 24–18
	Pts: Mickeal 26; Rebs: Mickeal 13; Asts: Mickeal 7	Boxscore	Pts: Gasol 25; Rebs: Odom 18; Asts: Bryant 3	Arena: Palau Sant Jordi; Attendance: 16,236; Referees: Jason Phillips, Emilio Pérez Pizarro, Marc Davis

=== Lliga Catalana de Bàsquet ===
18 September 2010 Semifinal	Regal FC Barcelona	78–71	Assignia Manresa	Barcelona
19:00	Scoring by quarter: 14–15, 16–21, 27–15, 21–20
	Pts: Mickeal 14; Rebs: five players 4 Asts: Mickeal, Morris 3 PIR: Morris 20	Boxscore	Pts: Gladyr 21; Rebs: three players 4 Asts: San Miguel 5 PIR: Lewis 26	Arena: Palau Blaugrana; Referees: Xavier Amorós, Lluís Guirao, Pedro Munar

19 September 2010 Final	Regal FC Barcelona	95–79	DKV Joventut	Barcelona
17:00	Scoring by quarter: 25–15, 25–14, 23–25, 22–25
	Pts: Mickeal, Morris 17; Rebs: Morris 6 Asts: Rubio 7 PIR: Morris 28	Boxscore	Pts: Norel 21; Rebs: Norel, Trias 7 Asts: Robinson 3 PIR: Norel 22	Arena: Palau Blaugrana; Referees: Juan Carlos Mitjana, José Antonio Martin Bertran, Lluis Guirao

== Competitions ==
=== Overview ===
Competition	First match	Last match	Starting round	Final position	Record							
Competition	First match	Last match	Starting round	Final position	Pld	W	D	L	PF	PA	PD	Win %
Liga ACB	3 October 2010	14 June 2011	Round 1	Winners	42	35		7	3,221	2,742	+479	83.33
EuroLeague	21 October 2010	31 March 2011	Round 1	Quarterfinals	20	14		6	1,532	1,422	+110	70.00
Copa del Rey	11 February 2011	13 February 2011	Quarterfinals	Winners	3	3		0	246	199	+47	100.00
Supercopa	24 September 2010	25 September 2010	Semifinals	Winners	2	2		0	172	118	+54	100.00
Total					67	54	0	13	5,171	4,481	+690	80.60

Last updated: 3 February 2026
Source: Competitions

=== Liga ACB ===
==== League table ====
#	Teams	P	W	L	PF	PA	Qualification or relegation
1	Regal FC Barcelona	34	27	7	2614	2245	Qualified for the Playoffs
2	Real Madrid	34	26	8	2629	2501	Qualified for the Playoffs
3	Power Electronics Valencia	34	24	10	2570	2414	Qualified for the Playoffs
4	Caja Laboral	34	23	11	2693	2509	Qualified for the Playoffs
5	Gran Canaria 2014	34	21	13	2560	2405	Qualified for the Playoffs

Source: ACB

==== Results summary ====
Overall						Home					Away				
Pld	W	L	PF	PA	PD	W	L	PF	PA	PD	W	L	PF	PA	PD
34	27	7	2614	2245	+369	14	3	1354	1090	+264	13	4	1260	1155	+105

Source: Competitive matches

==== Results by round ====
Round	1	2	3	4	5	6	7	8	9	10	11	12	13	14	15	16	17	18	19	20	21	22	23	24	25	26	27	28	29	30	31	32	33	34
Ground	H	A	A	H	H	A	H	A	H	A	A	H	H	A	A	H	A	A	H	H	A	H	A	H	A	H	A	H	A	H	A	H	A	H
Result	W	W	W	L	W	W	W	L	W	L	W	W	W	W	W	W	W	W	W	W	W	W	L	W	W	W	W	L	L	W	W	W	W	L
Position	3	2	1	2	1	1	1	3	2	3	2	2	1	1	1	1	1	1	1	1	1	1	1	1	1	1	1	1	1	1	1	1	1	1

Source: Competitive matches
A = Away; H = Home; W = Win; L = Loss; R = Rest

==== Matches ====
3 October 2010 1	Regal FC Barcelona	83–58	Gran Canaria 2014	Barcelona
12:30	Scoring by quarter: 31–16, 24–20, 15–9, 13–13
	Pts: Navarro 18; Rebs: Morris 6 Asts: Rubio 11; PIR: Morris, Navarro 17	Boxscore	Pts: Carroll 17; Rebs: Rey 8 Asts: Carroll, Bellas 2 PIR: Rey, Wallace 10	Arena: Palau Blaugrana; Attendance: 4,259; Referees: Miguel Ángel Pérez Pérez, Carlos Sánchez Monserrat, Rubén Sánchez Mohedas

10 October 2010 2	CB Granada	78–85	Regal FC Barcelona	Granada
12:30	Scoring by quarter: 20–26, 16–16, 21–16, 21–27
	Pts: Ingles 25; Rebs: Kurz 11; Asts: Ingles 5 PIR: Ingles 34	Boxscore	Pts: Navarro 24; Rebs: Lorbek 6 Asts: Rubio 6 PIR: Navarro 24	Arena: Palacio Municipal de Deportes; Attendance: 6,972; Referees: Juan Carlos García González, Benjamín Jiménez, Juan José Martínez Díez

16 October 2010 3	Power Electronics Valencia	69–78	Regal FC Barcelona	Valencia
18:00	Scoring by quarter: 28–25, 8–14, 17–19, 16–20
	Pts: Lishchuk 21; Rebs: Javtokas, Lishchuk 11; Asts: Cook 8 PIR: Lishchuk 24	Boxscore	Pts: Navarro 22; Rebs: Vázquez 8 Asts: Grimau, Rubio 3 PIR: Vázquez 23	Arena: La Fonteta; Attendance: 8,900; Referees: Francisco De la Maza, Antonio Conde, Carlos Peruga

24 October 2010 4	Regal FC Barcelona	70–71(OT)	CAI Zaragoza	Barcelona
12:15	Scoring by quarter: 20–17, 16–18, 12–14, 14–13, Overtime: 8–9
	Pts: Mickeal 24; Rebs: Navarro, Sada 7 Asts: Sada 3 PIR: Mickeal 27	Boxscore	Pts: Hettsheimeir 16; Rebs: Barlow 9 Asts: van Rossom 5 PIR: Hettsheimeir 14	Arena: Palau Blaugrana; Attendance: 3,566; Referees: Vicente Bultó, Francisco Araña, David Soto

31 October 2010 5	Regal FC Barcelona	84–44	Menorca Bàsquet	Barcelona
12:30	Scoring by quarter: 25–13, 17–14, 27–8, 15–9
	Pts: Navarro 16; Rebs: Sada 10; Asts: Rubio 5 PIR: Lakovič 18	Boxscore	Pts: Donaldson 15; Rebs: Victor 7 Asts: Limonad 3 PIR: Donaldson 16	Arena: Palau Blaugrana; Attendance: 4,332; Referees: Juan Luis Redondo, Carlos Cortés, Anna Cardús

6 November 2010 6	Cajasol	67–75	Regal FC Barcelona	Seville
18:00	Scoring by quarter: 19–16, 18–22, 15–18, 15–19
	Pts: Bullock 13; Rebs: Davis 8 Asts: Bullock, Urtasun 3 PIR: Davis 22	Boxscore	Pts: Mickeal 23; Rebs: Mickeal 6 Asts: Rubio 5 PIR: Mickeal 30	Arena: Deportes San Pablo; Attendance: 7,500; Referees: Juan Carlos Mitjana, Miguel Ángel Pérez Pérez, Jacobo Rial

14 November 2010 7	Regal FC Barcelona	76–62	Baloncesto Fuenlabrada	Barcelona
12:30	Scoring by quarter: 19–13, 22–19, 22–11, 13–19
	Pts: Lakovič, Lorbek 13; Rebs: Lorbek 7 Asts: Mickeal, Rubio 4 PIR: Mickeal 20	Boxscore	Pts: Ayón, Valters 12; Rebs: Batista 7 Asts: Batista 3 PIR: Batista 23	Arena: Palau Blaugrana; Attendance: 4,361; Referees: José Ramón García Ortiz, José Javier Murgui, Antonio Sacristán

20 November 2010 8	Caja Laboral	87–80	Regal FC Barcelona	Vitoria-Gasteiz
18:00	Scoring by quarter: 23–21, 20–16, 15–13, 19–17
	Pts: Oleson 18; Rebs: Barać 13; Asts: Huertas 5 PIR: Barać 26	Boxscore	Pts: Rubio 15; Rebs: three players 3 Asts: Rubio 8 PIR: Rubio 22	Arena: Buesa Arena; Attendance: 9,700; Referees: Francisco De la Maza, Óscar Perea, Carlos Cortés

28 November 2010 9	Regal FC Barcelona	70–57	Assignia Manresa	Barcelona
12:30	Scoring by quarter: 17–12, 24–17, 12–12, 17–16
	Pts: Ingles 21; Rebs: Lorbek 13; Asts: Rubio 8 PIR: Lorbek 19	Boxscore	Pts: Slokar 14; Rebs: Majstorović, Slokar 8 Asts: San Miguel 5 PIR: Llorca 16	Arena: Palau Blaugrana; Attendance: 4,399; Referees: Xavier Amorós, Juan Carlos García González, Luis Miguel Castillo

5 December 2010 10	Asefa Estudiantes	63–62	Regal FC Barcelona	Madrid
12:30	Scoring by quarter: 18–11, 21–13, 10–15, 14–23
	Pts: Caner-Medley 12; Rebs: Caner-Medley 9 Asts: Granger 5 PIR: Caner-Medley 16	Boxscore	Pts: Lakovič 18; Rebs: Morris 6 Asts: Rubio 4 PIR: Lakovič 17	Arena: Palacio Vistalegre; Attendance: 13,5000; Referees: Xavier Amorós, José Javier Murgui, Antonio Sacristán

12 December 2010 11	Blancos de Rueda Valladolid	55–65	Regal FC Barcelona	Valladolid
18:00	Scoring by quarter: 17–6, 13–19, 15–18, 10–22
	Pts: Báez 16; Rebs: Báez 9 Asts: Dumas 5 PIR: Báez 22	Boxscore	Pts: Rubio 14; Rebs: N'Dong 12; Asts: Rubio 7 PIR: Rubio 21	Arena: Polideportivo Pisuerga; Attendance: 5,340; Referees: José Antonio Martín Bertrán, Juan José Martínez Díez, Miguel Ángel Pérez Niz

19 December 2010 12	Regal FC Barcelona	83–63	DKV Joventut	Barcelona
12:30	Scoring by quarter: 18–13, 18–15, 23–9, 24–26
	Pts: Morris 14; Rebs: Lorbek 7 Asts: Rubio 6 PIR: Sada 22	Boxscore	Pts: McDonald 15; Rebs: Hosley 9 Asts: English 4 PIR: Trias 13	Arena: Palau Blaugrana; Attendance: 5,459; Referees: Juan Carlos Mitjana, Vicente Bultó, Francisco Zafra

30 December 2010 13	Regal FC Barcelona	95–75	Real Madrid	Barcelona
19:00	Scoring by quarter: 28–15, 21–19, 25–21, 21–20
	Pts: Lakovič 17; Rebs: Vázquez 7 Asts: Rubio 5 PIR: Lorbek 24	Boxscore	Pts: Rodríguez, Tucker 13; Rebs: Fischer 10; Asts: Rodríguez 4 PIR: Fischer 19	Arena: Palau Blaugrana; Attendance: 7,411; Referees: Daniel Hierrezuelo, Antonio Conde, Carlos Peruga

2 January 2011 14	Bizkaia Bilbao Basket	63–65	Regal FC Barcelona	Bilbao
12:30	Scoring by quarter: 23–14, 14–17, 10–16, 16–18
	Pts: Mumbrú 12; Rebs: Hernández-Sonseca 10; Asts: three players 3 PIR: Hernández-Sonseca 17	Boxscore	Pts: Lorbek 18; Rebs: Lorbek, Rubio 6 Asts: Lorbek, Rubio 2 PIR: Lorbek 23	Arena: Bilbao Arena; Attendance: 8,793; Referees: Juan Carlos Arteaga, Benjamín Jiménez, Pedro Munar

8 January 2011 15	Unicaja	53–70	Regal FC Barcelona	Málaga
18:00	Scoring by quarter: 12–15, 16–21, 10–20, 15–14
	Pts: Freeland 20; Rebs: Freeland 10; Asts: Rodríguez 5 PIR: Freeland 22	Boxscore	Pts: Navarro 25; Rebs: Lorbek 10; Asts: Rubio 8 PIR: Navarro 16	Arena: Martín Carpena; Attendance: 11,000; Referees: Juan Luis Redondo, Vicente Bultó, Carlos Sánchez Monserrat

12 January 2011 16	Regal FC Barcelona	83–75	Meridiano Alicante	Barcelona
20:00	Scoring by quarter: 18–12, 22–23, 19–27, 24–13
	Pts: Anderson 24; Rebs: Rubio 8 Asts: Navarro 5 PIR: Anderson 27	Boxscore	Pts: Doellman 19; Rebs: Doellman 7 Asts: Heurtel 6 PIR: Doellman, Heurtel 14	Arena: Palau Blaugrana; Attendance: 3,357; Referees: Francisco De la Maza, Francisco Araña, Jacobo Rial

15 January 2011 17	Lagun Aro GBC	75–78	Regal FC Barcelona	San Sebastián
18:00	Scoring by quarter: 19–16, 17–18, 20–26, 19–18
	Pts: Panko 19; Rebs: Miralles 10; Asts: three players 2 PIR: Miralles, Panko 16	Boxscore	Pts: Navarro 22; Rebs: Anderson 6 Asts: Navarro 6 PIR: Navarro 27	Arena: Donostia Arena; Attendance: 7,680; Referees: Juan Carlos Arteaga, Carlos Peruga, David Soto

23 January 2011 18	Gran Canaria 2014	54–75	Regal FC Barcelona	Las Palmas
19:45	Scoring by quarter: 19–15, 12–16, 12–22, 11–22
	Pts: Wallace 17; Rebs: Rey 7 Asts: Green 3 PIR: Wallace 17	Boxscore	Pts: Navarro 23; Rebs: N'Dong 6 Asts: three players 3 PIR: Navarro 21	Arena: Centro Insular de Deportes; Attendance: 5,125; Referees: José Ramón García Ortiz, Antonio Conde, Miguel Ángel Pérez Niz

30 January 2011 19	Regal FC Barcelona	75–64	CB Granada	Barcelona
19:30	Scoring by quarter: 19–16, 17–10, 22–18, 17–20
	Pts: Anderson 16; Rebs: Lorbek 6 Asts: Rubio 5 PIR: Anderson 14	Boxscore	Pts: Karl 21; Rebs: Prestes 7 Asts: Gianella 3 PIR: Karl 23	Arena: Palau Blaugrana; Attendance: 4,314; Referees: Vicente Bultó, Juan José Martínez Díez, Anna Cardús

6 February 2011 20	Regal FC Barcelona	85–67	Power Electronics Valencia	Barcelona
12:30	Scoring by quarter: 17–18, 27–20, 16–13, 25–16
	Pts: Ingles 18; Rebs: Perović 4 Asts: Rubio 7 PIR: Ingles 20	Boxscore	Pts: Lishchuk, Martínez 15; Rebs: Augustine 7 Asts: Cook 5 PIR: Lishchuk 19	Arena: Palau Blaugrana; Attendance: 5,546; Referees: Daniel Hierrezuelo, Óscar Perea, Antonio Sacristán

20 February 2011 21	CAI Zaragoza	67–87	Regal FC Barcelona	Zaragoza
12:15	Scoring by quarter: 21–16, 15–28, 11–17, 20–26
	Pts: Quinteros 26; Rebs: Hettsheimeir, Quinteros 5 Asts: Quinteros 4 PIR: Quinteros 29	Boxscore	Pts: Anderson 15; Rebs: Morris, N'Dong 6 Asts: Rubio 4 PIR: Anderson 17	Arena: Príncipe Felipe; Attendance: 10,400; Referees: Francisco De la Maza, Carlos Cortés, Fernando Calatrava

26 February 2011 22	Regal FC Barcelona	89–66	Caja Laboral	Barcelona
18:00	Scoring by quarter: 21–19, 19–19, 21–16, 28–12
	Pts: Navarro 25; Rebs: N'Dong 8 Asts: Sada 7 PIR: Navarro 27	Boxscore	Pts: Barać 20; Rebs: Barać 13; Asts: Huertas 4 PIR: Barać 30	Arena: Palau Blaugrana; Attendance: 5,389; Referees: Juan Carlos Arteaga, Benjamín Jiménez, Luis Miguel Castillo

6 March 2011 23	Baloncesto Fuenlabrada	69–66	Regal FC Barcelona	Fuenlabrada
12:30	Scoring by quarter: 25–18, 15–12, 20–21, 9–15
	Pts: Ayón 24; Rebs: Ayón 8 Asts: Valters 6 PIR: Ayón 29	Boxscore	Pts: Navarro 20; Rebs: Vázquez 8 Asts: Rubio 4 PIR: Navarro 19	Arena: Fernando Martín; Attendance: 5,326; Referees: José Antonio Martín Bertrán, Vicente Bultó, Carlos Peruga

10 March 2011 24	Regal FC Barcelona	73–60	Cajasol	Barcelona
20:45	Scoring by quarter: 19–12, 22–17, 15–19, 17–12
	Pts: Navarro 16; Rebs: Vázquez 8 Asts: Sada 3 PIR: Navarro, Vázquez 17	Boxscore	Pts: Davis 20; Rebs: Davis 7 Asts: three players 2 PIR: Davis 23	Arena: Palau Blaugrana; Attendance: 4,571; Referees: Emilio Pérez Pizarro, Carlos Cortés, David Soto

13 March 2011 25	Menorca Bàsquet	73–78	Regal FC Barcelona	Mahón
12:30	Scoring by quarter: 18–12, 21–21, 18–20, 16–25
	Pts: Limonad 23; Rebs: Donaldson 7 Asts: four players 2 PIR: Donaldson 24	Boxscore	Pts: Navarro 20; Rebs: N'Dong 8 Asts: Lakovič 3 PIR: Navarro 18	Arena: Pavelló Menorca; Attendance: 3,600; Referees: Juan Carlos Arteaga, Carlos Sánchez Monserrat, Antonio Sacristán

18 March 2011 26	Regal FC Barcelona	73–53	Asefa Estudiantes	Barcelona
20:45	Scoring by quarter: 26–12, 19–25, 16–8, 12–8
	Pts: Anderson 14; Rebs: three players 5 Asts: Navarro 6 PIR: Navarro 16	Boxscore	Pts: Clark 12; Rebs: Caner-Medley, Clark 7 Asts: three players 2 PIR: Clark 18	Arena: Palau Blaugrana; Attendance: 4,377; Referees: Antonio Conde, Francisco Araña, Miguel Ángel Pérez Niz

27 March 2011 27	Assignia Manresa	64–72	Regal FC Barcelona	Manresa
12:30	Scoring by quarter: 16–20, 10–27, 22–10, 16–15
	Pts: Slokar 14; Rebs: Majstorović 9 Asts: San Miguel 6 PIR: Slokar 15	Boxscore	Pts: Grimau 13; Rebs: Rubio, Vázquez 8 Asts: Lakovič 4 PIR: Lakovič, Vázquez 187	Arena: Nou Congost; Attendance: 4,500; Referees: Óscar Perea, Benjamín Jiménez, Pedro Munar

2 April 2011 28	Regal FC Barcelona	78–83(OT)	Bizkaia Bilbao Basket	Barcelona
18:00	Scoring by quarter: 19–12, 23–18, 8–11, 18–27, Overtime: 10–15
	Pts: Anderson 16; Rebs: Morris, Vázquez 5 Asts: Grimau, Rubio 4 PIR: Anderson 14	Boxscore	Pts: Jackson 21; Rebs: Hervelle 18; Asts: Mumbrú 6 PIR: Mumbrú 24	Arena: Palau Blaugrana; Attendance: 4,991; Referees: José Antonio Martín Bertrán, Miguel Ángel Pérez Pérez, Fernando Calatrava

9 April 2011 29	Real Madrid	77–72(OT)	Regal FC Barcelona	Madrid
18:00	Scoring by quarter: 22–19, 12–10, 16–14, 14–21, Overtime: 13–8
	Pts: Suárez 19; Rebs: Suárez 7 Asts: Prigioni 6 PIR: Suárez 19	Boxscore	Pts: Ingles 14; Rebs: Vázquez 13; Asts: Rubio 3 PIR: Grimau 15	Arena: Caja Mágica; Attendance: 10,788; Referees: Emilio Pérez Pizarro, Juan Carlos García González, Juan José Martínez Díez

17 April 2011 30	Regal FC Barcelona	77–53	Blancos de Rueda Valladolid	Barcelona
12:30	Scoring by quarter: 24–13, 19–11, 14–12, 20–17
	Pts: Lorbek 16; Rebs: N'Dong 6 Asts: Rubio 7 PIR: Lorbek 19	Boxscore	Pts: Slaughter 9 Rebs: Slaughter 9 Asts: Stanic 3 PIR: Slaughter 15	Arena: Palau Blaugrana; Attendance: 4,083; Referees: Antonio Conde, Vicente Bultó, Luis Miguel Castillo

25 April 2011 31	DKV Joventut	65–68	Regal FC Barcelona	Barcelona
18:30	Scoring by quarter: 16–23, 11–16, 25–18, 13–11
	Pts: McDonald 16; Rebs: Llovet 6 Asts: Tomàs 3 PIR: Robinson 12	Boxscore	Pts: Anderson 18; Rebs: N'Dong 9 Asts: Rubio 6 PIR: Anderson 16	Arena: Palau Blaugrana; Attendance: 7,353; Referees: Juan Carlos Mitjana, Lluís Guirao, Anna Cardús

1 May 2011 32	Regal FC Barcelona	81–55	Lagun Aro GBC	Barcelona
19:00	Scoring by quarter: 18–16, 23–17, 21–14, 19–8
	Pts: Lorbek 15; Rebs: Vázquez 12; Asts: Navarro 5 PIR: Vázquez 26	Boxscore	Pts: Baron 17; Rebs: Salgado 6 Asts: Salgado 4 PIR: Baron 11	Arena: Palau Blaugrana; Attendance: 4,336; Referees: Francisco De la Maza, Carlos Sánchez Monserrat, Miguel Ángel Pérez Niz

4 May 2011 33	Meridiano Alicante	76–84	Regal FC Barcelona	Alacant
20:00	Scoring by quarter: 13–20, 16–23, 27–17, 20–24
	Pts: Heurtel 16; Rebs: Doellman 9 Asts: Heurtel 4 PIR: Andriuškevičius 19	Boxscore	Pts: Navarro 25; Rebs: Vázquez 8 Asts: four players 3 PIR: Navarro 24	Arena: Centro de Tecnificación; Attendance: 4,065; Referees: Daniel Hierrezuelo, Carlos Peruga, Jorge Martínez

15 May 2011 34	Regal FC Barcelona	79–84	Unicaja	Barcelona
19:00	Scoring by quarter: 22–21, 15–24, 21–17, 21–22
	Pts: Navarro 18; Rebs: Vázquez 5 Asts: Navarro 7 PIR: Navarro 16	Boxscore	Pts: Fitch 20; Rebs: Freeland 7 Asts: Rodríguez 5 PIR: Freeland, Rodríguez 15	Arena: Palau Blaugrana; Attendance: 4,266; Referees: Juan Carlos Arteaga, Juan Carlos García González, Jacobo Rial

=== ACB Playoffs ===
==== Quarterfinals ====
19 May 2011 1	Regal FC Barcelona	76–65	Unicaja	Barcelona
20:30	Scoring by quarter: 16–12, 21–23, 21–8, 18–22
	Pts: Navarro 17; Rebs: three players 5 Asts: Sada 5 PIR: Navarro 17	Boxscore	Pts: Tripković 13; Rebs: Garbajosa 8 Asts: Freeland 4 PIR: Freeland 19	Arena: Palau Blaugrana; Attendance: 4,327; Referees: Francisco De la Maza, Antonio Conde, Óscar Perea

21 May 2011 2	Unicaja	52–84	Regal FC Barcelona	Málaga
18:00	Scoring by quarter: 6–17, 14–17, 18–26, 14–24
	Pts: Freeland 14; Rebs: Freeland 8 Asts: three players 2 PIR: Freeland 11	Boxscore	Pts: Morris 13; Rebs: Morris 6 Asts: Rubio 7 PIR: Lorbek 17	Arena: Martín Carpena; Attendance: 11,000; Referees: José Antonio Martín Bertrán, Juan Carlos García González, Benjamín Jiménez

==== Semifinals ====
27 May 2011 1	Regal FC Barcelona	86–71	Caja Laboral	Barcelona
20:00	Scoring by quarter: 18–19, 22–22, 32–20, 14–10
	Pts: four players 17; Rebs: Lorbek 10; Asts: Navarro 6 PIR: Lorbek 25	Boxscore	Pts: Teletović 23; Rebs: San Emeterio 7 Asts: Huertas 6 PIR: Teletović 20	Arena: Palau Blaugrana; Attendance: 4,866; Referees: Daniel Hierrezuelo, Juan Luis Redondo, Francisco Araña

29 May 2011 2	Regal FC Barcelona	78–62	Caja Laboral	Barcelona
12:30	Scoring by quarter: 18–19, 19–10, 16–18, 25–15
	Pts: Anderson 12; Rebs: Sada 7 Asts: Sada 5 PIR: Sada 15	Boxscore	Pts: San Emeterio 14; Rebs: Barać 9 Asts: Huertas 6 PIR: Barać 16	Arena: Palau Blaugrana; Attendance: 4,557; Referees: Emilio Pérez Pizarro, José Ramón García Ortiz, Benjamín Jiménez

1 June 2011 3	Caja Laboral	61–71	Regal FC Barcelona	Vitoria-Gasteiz
20:30	Scoring by quarter: 16–20, 15–15, 15–18, 15–18
	Pts: San Emeterio 14; Rebs: Batista 9 Asts: Huertas 5 PIR: San Emeterio 17	Boxscore	Pts: Navarro 13; Rebs: Sada 7 Asts: Lakovič, Sada 4 PIR: Rubio 15	Arena: Buesa Arena; Attendance: 9,500; Referees: Juan Carlos Arteaga, Vicente Bultó, Carlos Peruga

==== Finals ====
9 June 2011 1	Regal FC Barcelona	74–64	Bizkaia Bilbao Basket	Barcelona
20:45	Scoring by quarter: 26–12, 17–19, 21–9, 10–24
	Pts: Lorbek 24; Rebs: N'Dong 10; Asts: Rubio 5 PIR: Lorbek 28	Boxscore	Pts: Warren 12; Rebs: Hervelle 9 Asts: Fisher 4 PIR: Hervelle 15	Arena: Palau Blaugrana; Attendance: 6,821; Referees: Daniel Hierrezuelo, Juan Luis Redondo, Benjamín Jiménez

11 June 2011 2	Regal FC Barcelona	74–67	Bizkaia Bilbao Basket	Barcelona
18:15	Scoring by quarter: 14–11, 26–20, 14–9, 20–27
	Pts: Navarro 20; Rebs: Perović 7 Asts: Navarro, Sada 4 PIR: Navarro 23	Boxscore	Pts: Blūms, Vasileiadis 15; Rebs: Hervelle 10; Asts: Mumbrú 5 PIR: Vasileiadis 16	Arena: Palau Blaugrana; Attendance: 6,902; Referees: José Antonio Martín Bertrán, José Ramón García Ortiz, Juan Carlos García González

14 June 2011 3	Bizkaia Bilbao Basket	55–64	Regal FC Barcelona	Bilbao
20:45	Scoring by quarter: 19–12, 10–18, 18–18, 8–16
	Pts: Mumbrú 14; Rebs: Hervelle 7 Asts: Warren 2 PIR: Mumbrú 15	Boxscore	Pts: Navarro 16; Rebs: Sada 8 Asts: Navarro, Sada 4 PIR: N'Dong 15	Arena: Bilbao Arena; Attendance: 8,682; Referees: Juan Carlos Arteaga, Emilio Pérez Pizarro, Antonio Conde

=== EuroLeague ===
==== Results summary ====
Overall						Home					Away				
Pld	W	L	PF	PA	PD	W	L	PF	PA	PD	W	L	PF	PA	PD
16	13	3	1237	1111	+126	7	1	596	509	+87	6	2	641	602	+39

Source: Competitive matches

=== Regular season ===
==== Group C ====
	Team	Pld	W	L	PF	PA	Diff
1.	(Italy) Montepaschi Siena	10	8	2	787	661	+126
2.	(Turkey) Fenerbahçe Ülker	10	7	3	795	723	+72
3.	(Spain) Regal FC Barcelona	10	7	3	766	709	+57
4.	(Lithuania) Lietuvos Rytas	10	4	6	779	784	−5
5.	(France) Cholet	10	4	6	705	774	−69
6.	(Croatia) Cibona	10	0	10	677	858	−181

==== Matches ====
21 October 2010 1	Regal FC Barcelona (Spanish Basketball Federation)	80–66	(Croatian Basketball Federation) Cibona Zagreb	Barcelona
20:45	Scoring by quarter: 17–12, 18–8, 21–21, 24–25
	Pts: Navarro, Rubio 14; Rebs: Vázquez 7 Asts: Navarro 4 PIR: Rubio 25	Boxscore	Pts: Bogdanović 28; Rebs: Radošević 9 Asts: Stipčević 7 PIR: Radošević 24	Arena: Palau Blaugrana; Attendance: 4,157; Referees: Zoran Šutulović, Robert Lottermoser, Renaud Geller

27 October 2010 2	Cholet Basket (French Federation of Basketball)	77–84	(Spanish Basketball Federation) Regal FC Barcelona	Cholet
20:45	Scoring by quarter: 14–24, 15–14, 22–20, 26–26
	Pts: Mejía 17; Rebs: Falker 7 Asts: Mejía 5 PIR: Robinson 18	Boxscore	Pts: Lorbek 19; Rebs: N'Dong 7 Asts: Navarro 6 PIR: Lorbek 27	Arena: La Meilleraie; Attendance: 4,800; Referees: Luigi Lamonica, Luis Lopes, Tomasz Trawicki

4 November 2010 3	Regal FC Barcelona (Spain)	61–69	(Turkey) Fenerbahçe Ülker Istanbul	Barcelona
20:45	Scoring by quarter: 13–14, 15–18, 17–12, 16–25
	Pts: Mickeal 14; Rebs: Vázquez 7 Asts: three players 2 PIR: Mickeal 18	Boxscore	Pts: Ukić 13; Rebs: three players 6 Asts: Greer 4 PIR: Ukić 19	Arena: Palau Blaugrana; Attendance: 4,217; Referees: Ilija Belošević, Fernando Rocha, Eddie Viator

11 November 2010 4	Regal FC Barcelona (Spain)	69–55	(Lithuania) Lietuvos Rytas Vilnius	Barcelona
20:45	Scoring by quarter: 10–11, 24–14, 17–12, 18–18
	Pts: Mickeal 16; Rebs: Lorbek 6 Asts: Rubio, Sada 4 PIR: three players 15	Boxscore	Pts: Bjelica 13; Rebs: Jomantas 6 Asts: El-Amin, Gecevičius 4 PIR: Bjelica, El-Amin 14	Arena: Palau Blaugrana; Attendance: 3,662; Referees: Christos Christodoulou, David Chambon, Carmelo Paternico

17 November 2010 5	Montepaschi Siena (Italy)	76–67	(Spain) Regal FC Barcelona	Siena
20:45	Scoring by quarter: 26–23, 17–17, 21–15, 12–12
	Pts: McCalebb 21; Rebs: Lavrinovič 6 Asts: Kaukėnas 3 PIR: McCalebb 21	Boxscore	Pts: Lorbek, Mickeal 15; Rebs: Mickeal 6 Asts: Lorbek, Rubio 2 PIR: Lorbek 17	Arena: PalaEstra; Attendance: 4,893; Referees: Carl Jungebrand, Matej Boltauzer, Olegs Latisevs

25 November 2010 6	Cibona Zagreb (Croatia)	75–94	(Spain) Regal FC Barcelona	Zagreb
18:30	Scoring by quarter: 13–24, 23–20, 21–27, 18–23
	Pts: Bogdanović 26; Rebs: Bogdanović, Radošević 6 Asts: Bogdanović, Vragović 2 PIR: Bogdanović 24	Boxscore	Pts: Rubio 18; Rebs: Sada 7 Asts: Sada 5 PIR: Rubio 22	Arena: Dražen Petrović Basketball Hall; Attendance: 5,000; Referees: Guerrino Cerebuch, Roberto Chiari, Tomas Jasevicius

2 December 2010 7	Regal FC Barcelona (Spain)	76–62	(France) Cholet Basket	Barcelona
20:45	Scoring by quarter: 18–20, 26–8, 17–16, 15–18
	Pts: N'Dong 15; Rebs: Morris 8 Asts: Rubio 5 PIR: Morris, Perović 19	Boxscore	Pts: Nelson 14; Rebs: Léonard, Robinson 6 Asts: Vebobe 2 PIR: Léonard 12	Arena: Palau Blaugrana; Attendance: 3,786; Referees: Recep Ankarali, Milija Vojinovic, Elias Koromilas

9 December 2010 8	Fenerbahçe Ülker Istanbul (Turkey)	69–75	(Spain) Regal FC Barcelona	Istanbul
19:15	Scoring by quarter: 14–21, 14–19, 23–16, 18–19
	Pts: Ukić 13; Rebs: Türkcan 12; Asts: Ukić 5 PIR: Peker 15	Boxscore	Pts: N'Dong 14; Rebs: Vázquez 9 Asts: Rubio 10; PIR: Rubio 25	Arena: Sinan Erdem Dome; Attendance: 15,752; Referees: Christos Christodoulou, Paolo Taurino, Borys Ryzhyk

16 December 2010 9	Lietuvos Rytas Vilnius (Lithuania)	88–87	(Spain) Regal FC Barcelona	Vilnius
19:45	Scoring by quarter: 19–13, 21–21, 20–21, 28–32
	Pts: Bjelica 19; Rebs: three players 6 Asts: Jasikevičius 10; PIR: Bajramović 18	Boxscore	Pts: Vázquez 27; Rebs: Vázquez 9 Asts: Sada 6 PIR: Vázquez 31	Arena: Siemens Arena; Attendance: 9,250; Referees: Ilija Belošević, Matej Boltauzer, Jakub Zamojski

23 December 2010 10	Regal FC Barcelona (Spain)	73–72	(Italy) Montepaschi Siena	Barcelona
20:45	Scoring by quarter: 13–17, 18–20, 25–18, 17–17
	Pts: Vázquez 13; Rebs: Morris 8 Asts: Rubio 3 PIR: Vázquez 19	Boxscore	Pts: McCalebb 20; Rebs: Raković 7 Asts: Moss 3 PIR: McCalebb 15	Arena: Palau Blaugrana; Attendance: 4,619; Referees: Grzegorz Ziemblicki, Milivoje Jovcic, Fernando Rocha

=== Top 16 ===
==== Group F ====
	Team	Pld	W	L	PF	PA	Diff
1.	(Spain) Regal FC Barcelona	6	6	0	471	402	+69
2.	(Israel) Maccabi Electra	6	3	3	511	442	+69
3.	(Italy) Lottomatica Roma	6	2	4	411	462	−51
4.	(Slovenia) Union Olimpija	6	1	5	394	481	−87

==== Matches ====
20 January 2011 1	Regal FC Barcelona (Spanish Basketball Federation)	81–71	(Israeli Basketball Association) Maccabi Electra Tel Aviv	Barcelona
20:45	Scoring by quarter: 21–16, 20–21, 22–16, 18–18
	Pts: Navarro 24; Rebs: Perović 6 Asts: Rubio 8 PIR: Navarro 27	Boxscore	Pts: Hendrix, Perkins 13; Rebs: Perkins 8 Asts: Eidson 4 PIR: Hendrix 18	Arena: Palau Blaugrana; Attendance: 6,235; Referees: Carl Jungebrand, Sreten Radović, Oļegs Latiševs

27 January 2011 2	Union Olimpija Ljubljana (Slovenia)	67–68	(Spanish Basketball Federation) Regal FC Barcelona	Ljubljana
20:45	Scoring by quarter: 11–19, 15–17, 28–16, 13–16
	Pts: Gregory, Shermadini 14; Rebs: Gregory 9 Asts: Ilievski 6 PIR: Shermadini 21	Boxscore	Pts: Navarro 27; Rebs: Lorbek 7 Asts: Rubio 3 PIR: Navarro 24	Arena: Arena Stožice; Attendance: 13,000; Referees: Christos Christodoulou, Recep Ankarali, Panagiotis Anastopoulos

3 February 2011 3	Regal FC Barcelona (Spain)	80–56	(Italy) Lottomatica Roma	Barcelona
20:45	Scoring by quarter: 21–17, 24–19, 16–9, 19–11
	Pts: Anderson 16; Rebs: Rubio, Vázquez 5 Asts: Rubio, Sada 5 PIR: Vázquez 19	Boxscore	Pts: Traoré 17; Rebs: Datome 10; Asts: Smith 3 PIR: Traoré 19	Arena: Palau Blaugrana; Attendance: 5,358; Referees: Zoran Sutulovic, Srdan Dozai, Robert Lottermoser

17 February 2011 4	Lottomatica Roma (Italy)	65–74	(Spain) Regal FC Barcelona	Rome
20:45	Scoring by quarter: 14–14, 13–11, 24–21, 14–28
	Pts: Datome 15; Rebs: Crosariol, Washington 7 Asts: three players 3 PIR: Datome 17	Boxscore	Pts: Navarro 19; Rebs: Rubio 8 Asts: Rubio 4 PIR: Rubio 21	Arena: PalaLottomatica; Attendance: 3,662; Referees: Grzegorz Ziemblicki, Dubravko Muhvic, Elias Koromilas

24 February 2011 5	Maccabi Electra Tel Aviv (Israel)	85–92(OT)	(Spain) Regal FC Barcelona	Tel Aviv
20:00	Scoring by quarter: 24–16, 15–14, 21–24, 13–19, Overtime: 12–19
	Pts: Pargo 19; Rebs: Hendrix 9 Asts: Eidson 3 PIR: Perkins 15	Boxscore	Pts: Morris 19; Rebs: Perović 9 Asts: Navarro 4 PIR: Morris 23	Arena: Nokia Arena; Attendance: 11,500; Referees: Luigi Lamonica, Saša Pukl, Oļegs Latiševs

3 March 2011 6	Regal FC Barcelona (Spain)	76–58	(Slovenia) Union Olimpija Ljubljana	Barcelona
20:45	Scoring by quarter: 21–19, 14–12, 16–13, 25–14
	Pts: Lakovič 12; Rebs: Lorbek, Morris 6 Asts: Rubio 6 PIR: Lakovič 16	Boxscore	Pts: Gregory, Jagodnik 13; Rebs: Gregory 7 Asts: Udrih 3 PIR: Anagonye 12	Arena: Palau Blaugrana; Attendance: 4,126; Referees: Milivoje Jovcic, Tolga Sahin, Panagiotis Anastopoulos

=== Quarterfinals ===
22 March 2011 1	Regal FC Barcelona (Spanish Basketball Federation)	83–82	(Hellenic Basketball Federation) Panathinaikos Athens	Barcelona
20:45	Scoring by quarter: 14–14, 23–21, 20–25, 26–22
	Pts: Navarro 13; Rebs: three players 4 Asts: Lakovič, Navarro 3 PIR: Navarro 16	Boxscore	Pts: Diamantidis 26; Rebs: Fotsis 8 Asts: Diamantidis 2 PIR: Diamantidis 23	Arena: Palau Blaugrana; Attendance: 6,779; Referees: Zoran Šutulović, Matej Boltauzer, Oļegs Latiševs

24 March 2011 2	Regal FC Barcelona (Spanish Basketball Federation)	71–75	(Hellenic Basketball Federation) Panathinaikos Athens	Barcelona
20:45	Scoring by quarter: 17–10, 21–18, 19–28, 14–19
	Pts: Navarro 19; Rebs: Anderson 6 Asts: Navarro, Sada 3 PIR: Navarro 21	Boxscore	Pts: Sato 18; Rebs: three players 4 Asts: Diamantidis 5 PIR: Sato 20	Arena: Palau Blaugrana; Attendance: 7,319; Referees: Guerrino Cerebuch, Srdan Dozai, Jakub Zamojski

29 March 2011 3	Panathinaikos Athens (Greece)	76–74	(Spain) Regal FC Barcelona	Marousi
20:45	Scoring by quarter: 16–13, 17–16, 22–20, 21–25
	Pts: Diamantidis 18; Rebs: Tsartsaris 7 Asts: Diamantidis 7 PIR: Diamantidis 24	Boxscore	Pts: Rubio 16; Rebs: Vázquez 11; Asts: Sada 4 PIR: Vázquez 14	Arena: OAKA Basketball Arena; Attendance: 19,000; Referees: Grzegorz Ziemblicki, Saša Pukl, Fernando Rocha

31 March 2011 4	Panathinaikos Athens (Greece)	78–67	(Spain) Regal FC Barcelona	Marousi
20:45	Scoring by quarter: 16–12, 18–21, 22–14, 22–20
	Pts: Calathes 12; Rebs: Batiste, Fotsis 6 Asts: Diamantidis 5 PIR: Fotsis 16	Boxscore	Pts: Vázquez 14; Rebs: Morris, Vázquez 5 Asts: Lakovič 6 PIR: Lorbek 18	Arena: OAKA Basketball Arena; Attendance: 19,000; Referees: Luigi Lamonica, Volodymr Drabikovsky, Borys Ryzhyk

=== Copa del Rey ===
==== Quarterfinals ====
11 February 2011	Regal FC Barcelona	86–66	DKV Joventut	Madrid
21:30	Scoring by quarter: 24–18, 19–15, 15–19, 28–14
	Pts: N'Dong 18; Rebs: Morris, Rubio 6 Asts: Lakovič 6 PIR: N'Dong 25	Boxscore	Pts: Hosley, McDonald 13; Rebs: Trias 8 Asts: Trias 6 PIR: Trias 21	Arena: WiZink Center; Attendance: 12,950; Referees: Juan Luis Redondo, Vicente Bultó, Óscar Perea

==== Semifinals ====
12 February 2011	Regal FC Barcelona	92–73	Caja Laboral	Madrid
20:30	Scoring by quarter: 21–11, 18–25, 23–13, 30–24
	Pts: Navarro 26; Rebs: Perović 8 Asts: Navarro, Rubio 3 PIR: Navarro 26	Boxscore	Pts: Barać, Logan 15; Rebs: Barać 8 Asts: Huertas 10; PIR: Barać 16	Arena: WiZink Center; Attendance: 13,045; Referees: Daniel Hierrezuelo, Juan Luis Redondo, Antonio Conde

==== Final ====
13 February 2011	Real Madrid	60–68	Regal FC Barcelona	Madrid
18:00	Scoring by quarter: 17–19, 13–11, 13–18, 17–20
	Pts: Tomić 12; Rebs: Suárez 9 Asts: Suárez 3 PIR: Suárez 18	Boxscore	Pts: Anderson 19; Rebs: N'Dong 8 Asts: Sada 6 PIR: Sada 20	Arena: WiZink Center; Attendance: 13,045; Referees: José Antonio Martín Bertrán, Daniel Hierrezuelo, Juan Luis Redondo

=== Supercopa de España ===
==== Semifinals ====
24 September 2010	Regal FC Barcelona	89–55	Real Madrid	Vitoria-Gasteiz
21:30	Scoring by quarter: 26–15, 19–14, 31–8, 13–18
	Pts: Morris 16; Rebs: three players 6 Asts: Navarro 6 PIR: Rubio 22	Boxscore	Pts: Tucker 15; Rebs: Reyes 5 Asts: Prigioni 3 PIR: Fischer, Tucker 10	Arena: Buesa Arena; Attendance: 9,500; Referees: Daniel Hierrezuelo, Antonio Conde, Carlos Peruga

==== Final ====
25 September 2010	Regal FC Barcelona	83–63	Power Electronics Valencia	Vitoria-Gasteiz
19:00	Scoring by quarter: 26–21, 14–8, 23–18, 20–16
	Pts: Navarro 22; Rebs: Morris 8 Asts: Rubio 4 PIR: Navarro 23	Boxscore	Pts: Savanović 16; Rebs: Šundov 10; Asts: Cook 5 PIR: Savanović 18	Arena: Buesa Arena; Attendance: 9,600; Referees: Daniel Hierrezuelo, Juan Luis Redondo, Benjamín Jiménez

== Individual awards ==
=== Copa del Rey ===
Finals MVP

- (United States) Alan Anderson

=== Supercopa ===
Final MVP

- (Spain) Juan Carlos Navarro

=== EuroLeague ===
All-EuroLeague First Team

- (Spain) Juan Carlos Navarro

MVP of the Month

- (Spain) Juan Carlos Navarro – January
