= 2010–11 Euroleague Regular Season Group C =

Standings and Results for Group C of the Regular Season phase of the 2010–11 Euroleague basketball tournament.

== Standings ==
Key to colors
Top four places in each group advance to Top 16

	Team	Pld	W	L	PF	PA	Diff	Tie-break
1.	(Italy) Montepaschi Siena	10	8	2	787	661	+126	
2.	(Turkey) Fenerbahçe Ülker	10	7	3	795	723	+72	1–1 +2
3.	(Spain) FC Barcelona	10	7	3	766	709	+57	1–1 −2
4.	(Lithuania) Lietuvos Rytas	10	4	6	779	784	−5	1–1 +8
5.	(France) Cholet	10	4	6	705	774	−69	1–1 −8
6.	(Croatia) Cibona	10	0	10	677	858	−181	

== Fixtures and results ==
All times given below are in Central European Time.

=== Game 1 ===
20 October 2010
19:15

Report

Fenerbahçe Ülker (Turkey)	86–67	(Lithuania) Lietuvos Rytas
Scoring by quarter: 24–16, 16–11, 22–18, 24–24
Pts: Lavrinovič 21; Rebs: Peker 11; Asts: Ukić 7		Pts: Bjelica, Newley 15; Rebs: Valančiūnas 10; Asts: Milošević 5

Sinan Erdem Dome, Istanbul
Attendance: 8,424
Referees: Sasa Pukl (SLO), Spiros Gkontas (GRE), Zdravko Rutesic (MNE)

21 October 2010
20:45

Report

Regal FC Barcelona (Spain)	80–66	(Croatia) Cibona
Scoring by quarter: 17–12, 18–8, 21–21, 24–25
Pts: Rubio, Navarro 14; Rebs: Vázquez 7 Asts: Navarro 4		Pts: Bogdanović 28; Rebs: Radosevic 9 Asts: Stipčević 7

Palau Blaugrana, Barcelona
Attendance: 4,157
Referees: Zoran Sutulovic (MNE), Robert Lottermoser (GER), Renaud Geller (BEL)

21 October 2010
21:00

Report

Montepaschi Siena (Italy)	76–44	(France) Cholet
Scoring by quarter: 22–12, 11–16, 22–12, 21–4
Pts: Carraretto, Lavrinovič 13; Rebs: Raković, Lavrinovič 6 Asts: McCalebb 5		Pts: Robinson 9 Rebs: Falker 9 Asts: Causeur 3

Palasport Mens Sana, Siena
Attendance: 4,487
Referees: Sreten Radovic (CRO), Antonio Conde (ESP), Anastasios Pilodis (GRE)

=== Game 2 ===
27 October 2010
18:45

Report

Lietuvos Rytas (Lithuania)	75–79	(Italy) Montepaschi Siena
Scoring by quarter: 21–15, 18–24, 19–21, 17–19
Pts: Bjelica 18; Rebs: Bajramović 12; Asts: Milošević, El-Amin 4		Pts: Kaukėnas 16; Rebs: Lavrinovič 7 Asts: Stonerook 4

Siemens Arena, Vilnius
Attendance: 7,000
Referees: Juan Carlos Arteaga (ESP), Borys Ryzhyk (UKR), Robert Vyklicky (CZE)

27 October 2010
20:45

Report

Cholet (France)	77–84	(Spain) Regal FC Barcelona
Scoring by quarter: 14–24, 15–14, 22–20, 26–26
Pts: Mejia 17; Rebs: Falker 7 Asts: Mejia 5		Pts: Lorbek 19; Rebs: N'Dong 7 Asts: Navarro 6

La Meilleraie, Cholet
Attendance: 4,800
Referees: Luigi Lamonica (ITA), Luis Lopes (POR), Tomas Trawicki (POL)

28 October 2010
18:30

Report

Cibona (Croatia)	68–73	(Turkey) Fenerbahçe Ülker
Scoring by quarter: 19–19, 21–23, 11–16, 17–15
Pts: Radošević 16; Rebs: Zubčić 7 Asts: Stipčević 6		Pts: Kinsey 17; Rebs: Türkcan 9 Asts: Ukić 4

Dražen Petrović Basketball Hall, Zagreb
Attendance: 4,500
Referees: Jose Ramon Garcia Ortiz (ESP), Gianpaolo Cicoria (ITA), Sergiy Chebyshev (UKR)

=== Game 3 ===
3 November 2010
21:00

Report

Montepaschi Siena (Italy)	80–57	(Croatia) Cibona
Scoring by quarter: 21–13, 19–22, 17–9, 23–13
Pts: Kaukėnas 16; Rebs: Lavrinovič, Stonerook 6 Asts: Moss 4		Pts: Pašalić 17; Rebs: Pašalić 7 Asts: Stipčević, Radošević 3

Palasport Mens Sana, Siena
Attendance: 4,552
Referees: Dani Hierrezuelo (ESP), Murat Biricik (TUR), Nicola Maestre (FRA)

4 November 2010
19:00

Report

Cholet (France)	73–69	(Lithuania) Lietuvos Rytas
Scoring by quarter: 16–18, 21–15, 16–16, 20–20
Pts: Causeur 20; Rebs: Falker 14; Asts: Three players 2		Pts: Gecevičius 19; Rebs: Bjelica 7 Asts: Newley 4

La Meilleraie, Cholet
Attendance: 4,800
Referees: Jose Ramon Garcia Ortiz (ESP), Juan Carlos Garcia Gonzalez (ESP), Marko Juras (SRB)

4 November 2010
20:45

Report

Regal FC Barcelona (Spain)	61–69	(Turkey) Fenerbahçe Ülker
Scoring by quarter: 13–14, 15–18, 17–12, 16–25
Pts: Mickeal 17; Rebs: Vázquez 7 Asts: Three players 2		Pts: Ukić 13; Rebs: Three players 6 Asts: Greer 4

Palau Blaugrana, Barcelona
Attendance: 4,217
Referees: Ilija Belosevic (SRB), Fernando Rocha (POR), Eddie Viator (FRA)

=== Game 4 ===
10 November 2010
19:15

Report

Fenerbahçe Ülker (Turkey)	81–68	(Italy) Montepaschi Siena
Scoring by quarter: 23–17, 17–17, 18–14, 23–20
Pts: Türkcan 13; Rebs: Türkcan 10; Asts: Onan 3		Pts: McCalebb 18; Rebs: Stonerook 7 Asts: Zisis, Moss 4

Sinan Erdem Dome, Istanbul
Attendance: 14,785
Referees: José Martín (ESP), Milivoje Jovcic (SRB), Robert Lottermoser (GER)

11 November 2010
18:30

Report

Cibona (Croatia)	71–84	(France) Cholet
Scoring by quarter: 20–27, 20–19, 18–17, 13–21
Pts: Radošević 19; Rebs: Pašalić, Radošević 10; Asts: Five players 2		Pts: Robinson 20; Rebs: Mejia 11; Asts: Mejia, Nelson 4

Dražen Petrović Basketball Hall, Zagreb
Attendance: 4,000
Referees: Volodymr Drabikvsky [UKR], Oscar Perea [ESP], Oliver Krause [GER]

11 November 2010
20:45

Report

Regal FC Barcelona (Spain)	69–55	(Lithuania) Lietuvos Rytas
Scoring by quarter: 10–11, 24–14, 17–12, 18–18
Pts: Mickeal 16; Rebs: Lorbek 6 Asts: Sada, Rubio 4		Pts: Bjelica 13; Rebs: Jomantas 6 Asts: Gecevičius, El-Amin 4

Palau Blaugrana, Barcelona
Attendance: 3,662
Referees: Christos Christodoulou (GRE), David Chambon (FRA), Carmelo Paternico (ITA)

=== Game 5 ===
17 November 2010
18:45

Report

Lietuvos Rytas (Lithuania)	90–62	(Croatia) Cibona
Scoring by quarter: 23–12, 15–17, 23–9, 29–24
Pts: El-Amin 19; Rebs: Bjelica 10; Asts: El-Amin 5		Pts: Bogdanović 19; Rebs: Stipčević, Radošević 4 Asts: Stipčević 4

Siemens Arena, Vilnius
Attendance: 9,200
Referees: José Martín (ESP), Antonio Conde (ESP), Marius Ciulin (ROU)

17 November 2010
20:30

Report

Cholet (France)	82–78	(Turkey) Fenerbahçe Ülker
Scoring by quarter: 20–24, 21–10, 19–18, 22–26
Pts: Mejia 29; Rebs: Marquis 8 Asts: Avdalović 5		Pts: Ukić, Kinsey 15; Rebs: Lavrinovič 8 Asts: Ukić 4

La Meilleraie, Cholet
Attendance: 4,800
Referees: Grzegorz Ziemlicki [POL], Carmelo Paternico [ITA], Panagiotis Anastopoulos [GRE]

17 November 2010
20:45

Report

Montepaschi Siena (Italy)	76–67	(Spain) Regal FC Barcelona
Scoring by quarter: 26–23, 17–17, 21–15, 12–12
Pts: McCalebb 21; Rebs: Lavrinovič 6 Asts: Kaukėnas 3		Pts: Lorbek, Mickeal 15; Rebs: Mickeal 6 Asts: Rubio, Lorbek 2

Palasport Mens Sana, Siena
Attendance: 4,893
Referees: Carl Jungebrand [FIN], Matej Boltauzer [SLO], Olegs Latisevs [LAT]

=== Game 6 ===
24 November 2010
18:45

Report

Lietuvos Rytas (Lithuania)	75–81	(Turkey) Fenerbahçe Ülker
Scoring by quarter: 13–18, 23–22, 14–25, 25–16
Pts: Gecevičius 16; Rebs: Nalga 8 Asts: Jasikevičius 8		Pts: Ukić 24; Rebs: Lavrinovič 6 Asts: Kinsey, Tomas 3

Siemens Arena, Vilnius
Attendance: 7,200
Referees: Juna Carlos Mitjana [ESP], Sergey Mikhaylov [RUS], Oscar Perea [ESP]

24 November 2010
19:00

Report

Cholet (France)	61–70	(Italy) Montepaschi Siena
Scoring by quarter: 18–14, 17–19, 12–14, 14–23
Pts: Robinson 15; Rebs: Robinson 9 Asts: Nelson 5		Pts: Lavrinovič 23; Rebs: Lavrinovič 8 Asts: McCalebb 5

La Meilleraie, Cholet
Attendance: 5,000
Referees: Dubravko Muhvic [CRO], Sinisa Herceg [CRO], Petri Mantyla [FIN]

25 November 2010
18:30

Report

Cibona (Croatia)	75–94	(Spain) Regal FC Barcelona
Scoring by quarter: 13–24, 23–20, 21–27, 18–23
Pts: Bogdanović 26; Rebs: Bogdanović, Radošević 6 Asts: Bogdanović, Vragović 2		Pts: Rubio 18; Rebs: Sada 7 Asts: Sada 5

Dražen Petrović Basketball Hall, Zagreb
Attendance: 5,000
Referees: Guerrino Cerebuch [ITA], Roberto Chiari [ITA], Tomas Jasevicius [LTU]

=== Game 7 ===
1 December 2010
19:15

Report

Fenerbahçe Ülker (Turkey)	100–70	(Croatia) Cibona
Scoring by quarter: 30–13, 19–16, 25–22, 26–19
Pts: Kinsey 20; Rebs: Türkcan 9 Asts: Ukić, Greer 4		Pts: Bogdanović 23; Rebs: Radošević, Zubčić 6 Asts: Stipčević 5

Sinan Erdem Dome, Istanbul
Attendance: 15,168
Referees: Juna Carlos Arteaga [ESP], Damir JavorAMIR [SLO], Joseph Bissang [FRA]

1 December 2010
21:00

Report

Montepaschi Siena (Italy)	90–72	(Lithuania) Lietuvos Rytas
Scoring by quarter: 31–16, 17–17, 20–18, 22–21
Pts: Kaukėnas 17; Rebs: Moss 6 Asts: McCalebb, Kaukėnas 4		Pts: Bjelica 17; Rebs: Valančiūnas 6 Asts: Gecevičius 4

Palasport Mens Sana, Siena
Attendance: 4,558
Referees: Grzegorz Ziemblicki [POL], Sradan Dozai [CRO], Apostolos Kalpakas [SWE]

2 December 2010
20:45

Report

Regal FC Barcelona (Spain)	76–62	(France) Cholet
Scoring by quarter: 18–20, 26–8, 17–16, 25–18
Pts: N'Dong 15; Rebs: Morris 8 Asts: Rubio 5		Pts: Nelson 14; Rebs: Robinson, Leonard 6 Asts: Vebobe 2

Palau Blaugrana, Barcelona
Attendance: 3,786
Referees: Recep Ankarali [TUR], Milija Vojinovic [SRB], Elias Koromilas [GRE]

=== Game 8 ===
8 December 2010
18:30

Report

Cibona (Croatia)	66–82	(Italy) Montepaschi Siena
Scoring by quarter: 15–15, 11–23, 19–21, 21–23
Pts: Radošević 20; Rebs: Zubčić, Radošević 7 Asts: Stipčević 4		Pts: Kaukėnas 20; Rebs: Lavrinovič, Ress 4 Asts: Kaukėnas 5

Dražen Petrović Basketball Hall, Zagreb
Attendance: 2,500
Referees: Recep Ankarali [TUR], Juan Carlos Garcia Gonzalez [ESP], Oskars Lucis [LAT]

9 December 2010
18:45

Report

Lietuvos Rytas (Lithuania)	92–80	(France) Cholet
Scoring by quarter: 28–20, 22–21, 22–21, 20–18
Pts: Gecevičius 19; Rebs: Nalga 9 Asts: Gecevičius 4		Pts: Mejia 17; Rebs: Mejia 6 Asts: Avdalović 6

Siemens Arena, Vilnius
Attendance: 5,500
Referees: Fabio Facchini [ITA], Renaud Geller [BEL], Lahdo Sharro [SWE]

9 December 2010
19:15

Report

Fenerbahçe Ülker (Turkey)	69–75	(Spain) Regal FC Barcelona
Scoring by quarter: 14–21, 14–19, 23–16, 18–19
Pts: Ukić 13; Rebs: Türkcan 12; Asts: Ukić 5		Pts: N'Dong 14; Rebs: Vázquez 9 Asts: Rubio 10

Sinan Erdem Dome, Istanbul
Attendance: 15,752
Referees: Christos Christodoulou [GRE], Paolo TaurinoAOLO [ITA], Borys Ryzhyk [UKR]

=== Game 9 ===
15 December 2010
20:30

Report

Cholet (France)	81–65	(Croatia) Cibona
Scoring by quarter: 22–15, 16–18, 21–19, 22–13
Pts: Mejia 16; Rebs: Robinson, Nelson 7 Asts: Avdalović 13		Pts: Bogdanović 16; Rebs: Radošević 8 Asts: Bogdanović 4

La Meilleraie, Cholet
Attendance: 4,800
Referees: Juan Carlos Mitjana [ESP], Tolga Sahin [ITA], Robert Vyklicky [CZE]

16 December 2010
19:45

Report

Lietuvos Rytas (Lithuania)	88–87	(Spain) Regal FC Barcelona
Scoring by quarter: 19–13, 21–21, 20–21, 28–32
Pts: Bjelica 19; Rebs: Three players 6 Asts: Jasikevičius 10		Pts: Vázquez 27; Rebs: Vázquez 9 Asts: Sada 6

Siemens Arena, Vilnius
Attendance: 9,250
Referees: Ilija Belosevic [SRB], Matej Boltauzer [SLO], Jakub Zamojski [POL]

16 December 2010
20:45

Report

Montepaschi Siena (Italy)	94–65	(Turkey) Fenerbahçe Ülker
Scoring by quarter: 27–14, 22–16, 23–19, 22–16
Pts: McCalebb 22; Rebs: K. Lavrinovič 11; Asts: McCalebb 7		Pts: D. Lavrinovič, Tomas 11; Rebs: Savaş 6 Asts: Kinsey 3

Palasport Mens Sana, Siena
Attendance: 4,713
Referees: Sasa Pukl [SLO], Zoran Sutulovic [MNE], Spiros Gkontas [GRE]

=== Game 10 ===
23 December 2010
20:45

Report

Fenerbahçe Ülker (Turkey)	93–61	(France) Cholet
Scoring by quarter: 16–16, 22–14, 21–13, 34–18
Pts: Lavrinovič 18; Rebs: Türkcan 8 Asts: Preldžič 11		Pts: Mejia 17; Rebs: Vebobe 8 Asts: Avdalović 4

Sinan Erdem Dome, Istanbul
Attendance: 10,245
Referees: José Martín (ESP), Matej Boltauzer (SLO), Luis Lopes (POR)

23 December 2010
20:45

Report

Cibona (Croatia)	77–94	(Lithuania) Lietuvos Rytas
Scoring by quarter: 20–21, 17–23, 27–23, 13–27
Pts: Bogdanović 28; Rebs: Zubčić 8 Asts: Stipčević, Zubčić 4		Pts: Bajramović 22; Rebs: Bajramović 9 Asts: El-Amin 5

Dražen Petrović Basketball Hall, Zagreb
Attendance: 1,500
Referees: Jose Ramon Garcia Ortiz (ESP), Guerrino Cerebuch (ITA), Nicola Maestre (FRA)

23 December 2010
20:45

Report

Regal FC Barcelona (Spain)	73–72	(Italy) Montepaschi Siena
Scoring by quarter: 13–17, 18–20, 25–18, 17–17
Pts: Vázquez 13; Rebs: Morris 8 Asts: Rubio 3		Pts: McCalebb 20; Rebs: Raković 7 Asts: Moss 3

Palasport Mens Sana, Siena
Attendance: 4,619
Referees: Grzegorz Ziemblicki (POL), Milivoje Jovcic (SRB), Fernando Rocha (POR)
