= Božinović =

Božinović (Serbian Cyrillic: Божиновић) is a surname of Serbo-Croatian origin, a patronymic of Božin.

Notable people with the surname include:

- Boško Božinović (1949−2018), Croatian middle-distance runner and conditioning coach
- Davor Božinović (born 1961), Croatian diplomat and politician
- Francisco Bozinovic (1959−2023), Croatian-Chilean biologist and academic
- Vidoja Božinović (born 1955), Serbian musician

== See also ==
- Božinov, surname
- Božović, surname
- Božić, surname
- Božinovac, village in Knjaževac, Serbia
- Božanovići, village in Kalinovik, Bosnia and Herzegovina
