= Božinov =

Božinov or Bojinov (Cyrillic: Божинов), its female form Božinova, is a south Slavic surname, a patronymic surname coined from first name Božin. Notable people with the name include:

- Todor Božinov (born 1998), Macedonian basketball player
- Risto Božinov (born 1969), Macedonian football player
- Valeri Božinov (born 1986), Bulgarian football player

== See also ==
- Božinović
