= Edis Nuri =

Macedonian basketball player (born 1982)

Edis Nuri (Едис Нури)
Personal information
- Born: August 13, 1982 (age 44) Skopje
- Listed height: 2.00 m (6 ft 7 in)

Career information
- Playing career: 1998–2026
- Position: Power forward

Career history
- 2001–2004: Karpoš Sokoli
- 2004: Polo Trejd
- 2004–2007: Karpoš Sokoli
- 2007: Vardar Osiguruvanje
- 2007–2008: Karpoš Sokoli
- 2009: MZT Skopje
- 2009: AMAK SP
- 2009–2010: Plejmejker Cubus
- 2010–2011: Lirija
- 2011–2013: Karpoš Sokoli
- 2017–2026: TFT

Career highlights
- Macedonian Cup winner (2022)

Edis Nuri is a Macedonian professional basketball power forward.
