= Kiril Nikolovski =

Macedonian basketball player

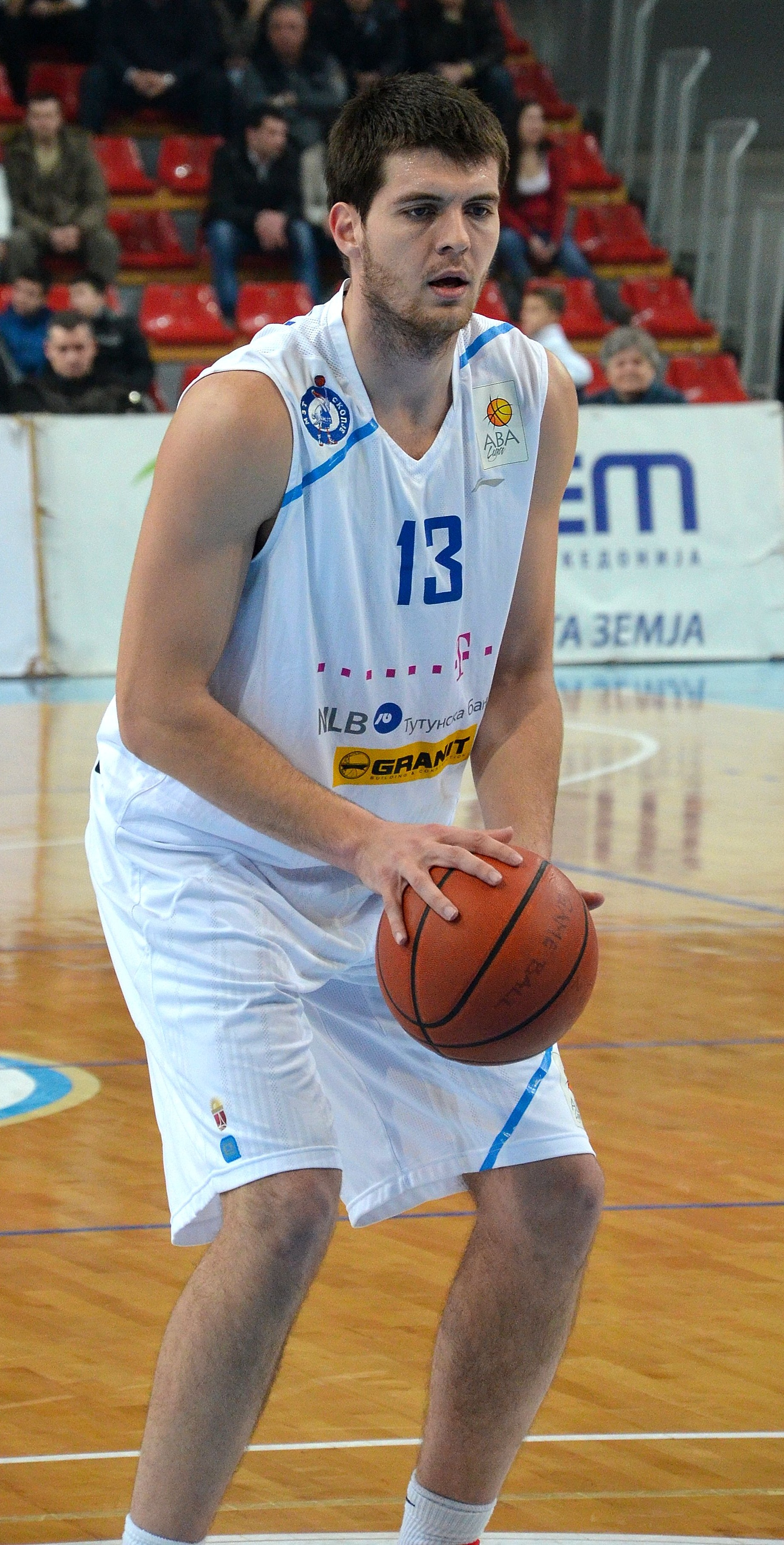
- season 2012/2013

Personal information
- Born: 9 June 1988 (age 38) Skopje, Macedonia
- Listed height: 2.10 m (6 ft 11 in)

Career information
- Playing career: 2004–present
- Position: Center

Career history
- 2004–2008: MZT Skopje
- 2008–2010: Vardar Osiguruvanje
- 2010–2011: MZT Skopje
- 2011–2012: Feni Industries
- 2012–2015: MZT Skopje
- 2015–2017: Feni Industries
- 2017: Karpoš Sokoli
- 2017–2021: Rabotnički
- 2021: Kožuv
- 2021–2022: EuroNickel 2005

Career highlights
- 4x Macedonian League champion (2013, 2014, 2015, 2018); Top Rebounder (8.7) of the Superleague Competition (2011); Eurobasket.com All-Macedonian League 2nd Team (2011)

Kiril Nikolovski (Macedonian: Кирил Николовски; born 9 June 1988) is a Macedonian professional basketball player born in Skopje. He is a former member of the Macedonian national basketball team.

== Pro career ==
Nikolovski started his pro career with Macedonian Team MZT Skopje in 2007.

Kiril is considered to be a versatile big man because of his dominating stature of 2.10 m (6 ft 11 in). His comfortable position is at center, however, he is capable of playing as a power forward due to his upside and talent.

On 28 June 2017, he signed with Karpoš Sokoli.

On 21 November 2017, he signed with Rabotnički.

== Macedonian national team ==
Nikolovski has also been a member of the Macedonian national basketball team since 2004, when he represented Macedonia at the FIBA Europe Under-16 Championship. He has competed with the team at all FIBA levels of U16, U18, U20, even the Senior team. He had helped Macedonia qualify to the EuroBasket 2011. Kiril Nikolovski is candidate for the Macedonian national basketball team for the 2012 FIBA World Olympic Qualifying Tournament in Caracas, Venezuela. According to the Coach Marjan Lazovski, Nikolovski, along with Aleksandar Kostoski and Bojan Trajkovski are likely to be the newest additions to the Senior team. “There is no need for big transformations of the roster (2011), but I will for certainly include Kiril Nikolovski (center) in the final squad (2012),” he said.
