= Todor Božinov =

Macedonian basketball player

Kozuv
- Position: Point guard
- League: Macedonian First League

Personal information
- Born: April 29, 1998 (age 28) Gevgelija, Macedonia
- Listed height: 1.85 m (6 ft 1 in)

Career information
- Playing career: 2014–present

Career history
- 2014–2016: Best Gevgelija
- 2016–2017: Kožuv
- 2017–2018: Blokotehna
- 2018–present: Kožuv

Todor Božinov (born April 29, 1998) is a Macedonian professional basketball point guard who currently plays for Kožuv in the Macedonian First League.
