= KK Karpoš Sokoli =

Basketball club in Skopje, North Macedonia

Karpoš Sokoli
- Nickname: Sokoli (Falcons)
- Leagues: Macedonian Second League
- Founded: 31 December 1996; 29 years ago
- History: 1996–2003; Sokoli; 2003–2004; Laško Pivo Sokoli; 2004–2005; Soko Štark Karpoš; 2005–2006; Toa Sum Jas; 2006–2008; Lisici Karpoš; 2008–present Karpoš Sokoli
- Arena: Boris Trajkovski Sports Center
- Capacity: 8,000
- Location: Skopje, North Macedonia
- Team colors: Blue and Yellow
- President: Ognen Dedić
- Head coach: Angel Tasevski
- Championships: 1 Macedonian Cup
- Website: www.kksokoli.mk
Home	Away

Karpoš Sokoli (Macedonian: Карпош Соколи) were a basketball club based in Skopje, North Macedonia.

For the first time in their history, Karpoš Sokoli was invited to the ABA League for the 2016–17 season which is considered to be the largest success of the club so far.

== History ==
=== Beginnings ===
KK Karpoš has been established on 31 December 1996. From the 2000–01 season the club is participating in the first league of Macedonia and the name of the well known basketball academy "Sokoli" has been added to the club's name. Since then the club's name is Karpoš Sokoli 2000 Skopje.

Although the club faced difficulties through the past decade, the club managed to continue participating in senior competitions while supporting its youth teams.

=== Glory days ===
From the 2012–13 season, the Municipality of Karpoš began financing the basketball club, and in May 2015, it became a shareholder. Since then, the club has developed at an impressive pace, achieving stronger results with each new season.

The most successful season in club's history so far is the 2015–16 season, when the club reached the finals of Macedonian National Cup and Semi-finals of the Macedonian National Championship, after finishing as runners-up in the regular part of the season.

For the first time in their history, Karpoš Sokoli managed to achieve the promotion to the ABA League for the 2016–17 season, which is considered to be the largest success of the club so far.

On 19 February 2017, the club won its first national title by defeating Feni Industries in the final of the Macedonian Basketball Cup.

== Honours ==
=== Domestic achievements ===
- Macedonian League
  - Runners-up (1): 2016–17
- Macedonian Cup
  - Winners (1): 2017
  - Runners-up (1): 2016
- Macedonian Super Cup
  - Runners-up (1): 2016

== Players ==
=== Current roster ===
Note: Flags indicate national team eligibility at FIBA-sanctioned events. Players may hold other non-FIBA nationalities not displayed.

KK Karpoš Sokoli roster
Players	Coaches
Pos. / No. / Nat. / Name / Ht. / Wt. / Age	Head coach: (North Macedonia) Vacant; Assistant coach(es) Physiotherapist(s): (North Macedonia) Vacant; Legend: (C) Team captain; Injured; Roster; Updated: 22 August 2017

=== Depth chart ===
Pos.	Starting 5	Bench
C
PF
SF
SG
PG

== Notable players ==
- (North Macedonia) Darko Sokolov
- (North Macedonia) Bojan Trajkovski
- (North Macedonia) Igor Penov
- (North Macedonia) Angel Tasevski
- (North Macedonia) Dime Tasovski
- (North Macedonia) Edis Nuri
- (Serbia) Igor Mijajlović
- (Serbia) Uroš Duvnjak
- (Serbia) Dragan Labović
- (Serbia) Strahinja Milošević
- (Serbia) Dragan Zeković
- (Serbia) Filip Šepa
- (Serbia) Dušan Knežević
- (Serbia) Marko Boltić
- (Serbia) Marko Mijović
- (Serbia) Aleksandar Petrović
- (Croatia) Zoran Vrkić
- (Croatia) Dominik Mavra
- (Croatia) Goran Vrbanc
- (United States) Kendrick Perry
- (United States) Thad McFadden
- (United States) Lamont Mack
- (United States) Darius Rice
- (Israel) Anton Kazarnovski
- (United Kingdom) Ryan Richards
- (Panama) Chris Warren

== Head coaches ==
- (North Macedonia) Ognen Dedić
- (North Macedonia) Aleksandar Petrović
- (North Macedonia) Borče Daskalovski
- (North Macedonia) Sašo Todorovski
- (North Macedonia) Boban Mitev
- (North Macedonia) Saša Katalinić
- (North Macedonia) Mihajlo Naumovski
- (Serbia) Siniša Matić
- (Serbia) Dragan Nikolić

== KK Karpoš Sokoli in European competitions ==
2017 FIBA Champions League

Round	Team	Home	Away
1st Qualifying round	(Estonia) Kalev/Cramo	79-87	78–81

2017 FIBA Europe Cup

Round	Team	Home	Away
Group stage	(Hungary) Szolnoki Olaj	73–91	94–73
Group stage	(Russia) Nizhny Novgorod	67–101	95–70
Group stage	(Hungary) Falco KC Szombathely	43–104	108–87
