= Božin =

Božin, Božina, Bozhin (Macedonian: Божин, Serbian Cyrillic: Божина) is a South Slavic masculine given name. Notable people with the name include:

- Božina Ivanović (1931–2002), Montenegrin anthropologist and politician
- Božin Pavlovski (born 1942), Macedonian-Australian novelist
- Božin Simić (1881–1966), veteran of the struggle for Macedonia and Old Serbia
- Bozhin Laskov (1922–2007), Bulgarian/Slovak football player
