= Bozhin =

Bozhin (Bulgarian or Russian: Божин) is a Slavic masculine given name; it is also a masculine surname with the feminine counterpart being Bozhina. It may refer to

- Bozhin Laskov (1922–2007), Bulgarian association football player
- Sergei Bozhin (born 1994), Russian football defender
