= Angel Tasevski =

Macedonian basketball player

Personal information
- Born: October 17, 1981 (age 45) Macedonia
- Listed height: 1.87 m (6 ft 2 in)

Career information
- Playing career: 2001–2016
- Position: Point guard

Career history

Playing
- 2001–2006: Karpoš Sokoli
- 2006–2008: AMAK SP
- 2008: MZT Skopje
- 2009–2010: Torus
- 2010–2012: Vardar
- 2012–2016: Karpoš Sokoli

Coaching
- 2016–2017: Karpoš Sokoli (ass.coach)
- 2017–2018: Karpoš Sokoli

Angel Tasevski (born October 17, 1981) is a former Macedonian professional basketball point guard who last played for Karpoš Sokoli in the Macedonian First League.
