= Božinovac =

Coordinates: 43°32′06″N 22°02′36″E

- Village
- Interactive map of Božinovac
- Country: Serbia
- District: Zaječar District
- Municipality: Knjaževac

Population (2002)
  - Total: 26
- Time zone: UTC+1 (CET)
  - Summer (DST): UTC+2 (CEST)

Božinovac is a village in the municipality of Knjaževac, Serbia. According to the 2002 census, the village has a population of 26 people.
