= Ty Harris =

American basketball player

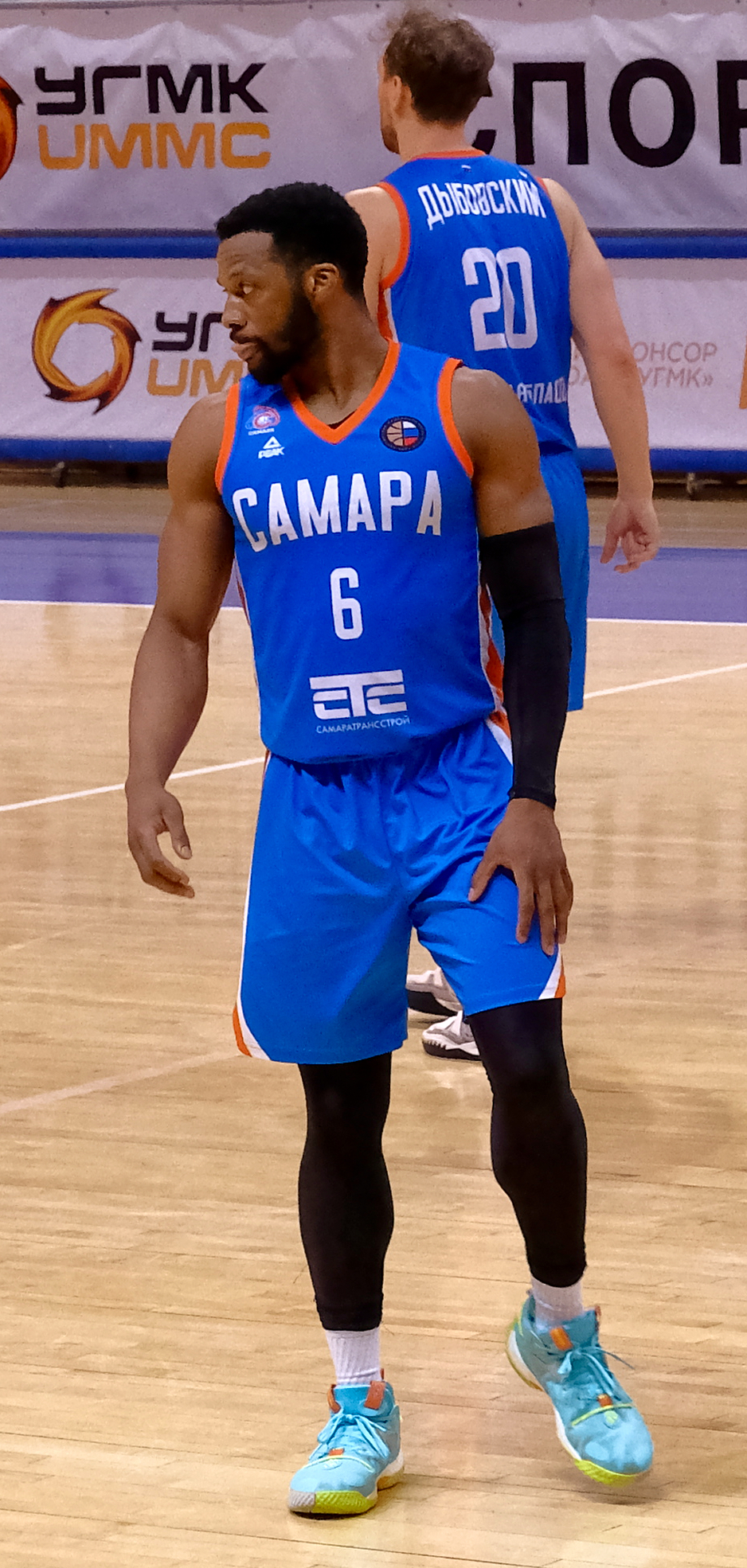

Borac Banja Luka
- Position: Point guard
- League: Bosnian Championship; Second ABA League

Personal information
- Born: November 13, 1991 (age 35) Houma, Louisiana, U.S.
- Listed height: 6 ft 2 in (1.88 m)
- Listed weight: 173.8 lb (79 kg)

Career information
- High school: West Carrollton (West Carrollton, Ohio)
- College: Edison State CC (2010–2011); Southern State CC (2012–2013); Columbus State (2013–2015)
- NBA draft: 2015: undrafted
- Playing career: 2015–present

Career history
- 2015–2016: Best Gevgelija
- 2016–2017: MAS Fez
- 2017: Shkupi
- 2018: Sloboda Tuzla
- 2018–2019: Pelister
- 2020: Akademija FMP
- 2020–2021: TFT Skopje
- 2021: Yeni Mamak Spor
- 2021–2023: Dynamo Vladivostok
- 2022: Samara
- 2023: Sigal Prishtina
- 2023–2024: Sloga
- 2024: Panionios
- 2024–present: Borac Banja Luka

Career highlights
- Balkan League MVP (2021); Balkan League Best Five (2021)

Tyron Jumord Harris (born November 13, 1991) is an American professional basketball player for Borac Banja Luka of the Championship of Bosnia and Herzegovina and the Second ABA League.

== Early life ==
Harris was born in Houma, Louisiana but his family was displaced by Hurricane Katrina. They eventually settled in West Carrollton, Ohio, a suburb of Dayton. He graduated from West Carrollton High School.

== Professional career ==
Not being drafted by any NBA team and being unknown in Europe, Harris signed for the 2015–16 season with the club KK Best in Macedonia.

On September 22, 2023, Harris joined Sigal Prishtina in Kosovo. Later that season, he left the club and joined Sloga in Serbia. On February 24, 2024, he joined Panionios of the Greek A2 Elite League.
