= KK Best =

КК Бест KK Best
- Leagues: Macedonian First League
- Founded: 2012
- Dissolved: 2016
- Arena: 26th April Hall
- Capacity: 1,600
- Location: Gevgelija, North Macedonia
- Team colors: Black and White
- Head coach: Vladimir Mirkovski
- Championships: 0

KK Best (Macedonian: КК Бест) is a defunct basketball club based in Gevgelija, North Macedonia. They played in the Macedonian First League.

== History ==
The club was founded in 2012, the first two seasons KK Best spend in the Macedonian Second Basketball league. In the season 2014/15 the team finished second on the table with the same number of points as two other teams, but having a better scoring difference of +234 (the best in the season) they get promoted to Macedonian First League.

== Current roster ==
KK Best roster
Players
Coaches

Pos.	No.	Nat.	Name	Ht.		Age
	-	(North Macedonia)	Kocev, Petar			30 – 25 August 1994
PF	-	(North Macedonia)	Mukaetov, Aleksandar	1.97 m (6 ft 6 in)		37 – 24 December 1987
C	-	(Zimbabwe)	Dibill, Dashen	2.11 m (6 ft 11 in)	116 kg (256 lb)
G	-	(United States)	Harris, Ty	1.88 m (6 ft 2 in)	79 kg (174 lb)	33 – 13 November 1991
PG	-	(North Macedonia)	Nikolov, Milan	1.84 m (6 ft 0 in)		39 – 5 November 1985
PG	-	(North Macedonia)	Janevski, Blagoj	1.92 m (6 ft 4 in)		39 – 7 April 1985
PF	-	(North Macedonia)	Lazarevski, Dragan	2.01 m (6 ft 7 in)		41 – 31 January 1984
PG	-	(North Macedonia)	Gajdadjiev, Nikola	1.93 m (6 ft 4 in)		32 – 2 April 1992
PG	-	(North Macedonia)	Nikolov, Pavle	1.88 m (6 ft 2 in)		32 – 6 May 1992
	-	(North Macedonia)	Stojkov, Riste			33 – 24 August 1991
	-	(North Macedonia)	Dimitrievski, Milan			30 – 25 September 1994
G	-	(North Macedonia)	Lazarevski, Dejan	1.92 m (6 ft 4 in)		31 – 28 June 1993
PF	-	(North Macedonia)	Taskov, Oliver	2.03 m (6 ft 8 in)		27 – 8 May 1997
C	-	(North Macedonia)	Delipetrov, Dimitar	2.03 m (6 ft 8 in)		32 – 26 March 1992
SF	-	(North Macedonia)	Toshev, Kiril	1.95 m (6 ft 5 in)	92 kg (203 lb)	28 – 25 February 1997

Head coach

- (North Macedonia) Vladimir Mirkovski

Assistant coach(es)

- (North Macedonia) Micko Aleksovski

Legend

- (C) Team captain
- Injured

- Roster
Updated: 2015-09-17
