= Luc-Arthur Vebobe =

French professional basketball player (born 1980)

No. 14 – Provence Basket
- Position: Power forward
- League: LNB Pro B

Personal information
- Born: April 3, 1980 (age 46) Antibes
- Listed height: 6 ft 7.52 in (2.02 m)
- Listed weight: 200 lb (91 kg)

Career information
- College: Seward County CC (1999–2000); Foothill College (2000–2001); Hawaii (2001–2002)
- NBA draft: 2003: undrafted
- Playing career: 1998–present

Career history
- 1998–1999, 2002: Antibes
- 2002–2003: Chalon-sur-Saône
- 2003–2005: Paris Basket Racing
- 2005–2006: CAI Zaragoza
- 2008–2009: ALM Évreux
- 2009–2010: Antibes
- 2010–2013: Cholet
- 2013–2014: Antibes
- 2014–2015: Chorale Roanne
- 2015–present: Provence Basket

Career highlights
- 2× LNB All-Star (2004, 2010)

Luc-Arthur Vebobe (born April 3, 1980) is a French professional basketball player who currently plays for Provence Basket in France's LNB Pro B.

== Amateur career ==
Born in Antibes, France, Luc-Arthur is the son of former basketball player Saint-Ange Vebobe. He starts his basketball debuts with the Youth team (Espoirs) of Antibes (1998–1999) before going to the United States in Junior Colleges (Seward County Community College & Foothill College) until 2001. He then joins the University of Hawaii where he plays in NCAA (2001-early 2002).

He played for the French Youth squad at the 1998 FIBA Europe Under-18 Championship where France ranked 10th and at the 2000 FIBA Europe Under-20 Championship where France ranked 8th.

== Pro career ==
Vebobe starts his professional career with its youth club Antibes (Pro A) in 2002 before joining Chalon-sur-Saône (Pro A) for the 2002-2003 season. He then goes to Paris Basket Racing for 2 seasons before going to Spain where he plays for Zaragoza (LEB) during the 2005-2006 season. Due to injuries, Vebobe did not play for any professional club between end of 2006 and beginning of 2008.

For the 2008-2009 season, ALM Evreux (Pro B) is giving him a chance to play again before joining Antibes (Pro B) again for the 2009-2010 season. Playing for Antibes, he won the French basketball cup 16th finals game versus Cholet Basket (76-70) where he drew the attention of coach Erman Kunter. He then joins Cholet Basket (Pro A), the 2010 French champion and plays the Euroleague for the 2010-2011 season.
