= Antywane Robinson =

American basketball player

Personal information
- Born: July 12, 1984 (age 42) Charlotte, North Carolina
- Listed height: 6 ft 7 in (2.01 m)
- Listed weight: 220 lb (100 kg)

Career information
- High school: Oak Hill Academy (Mouth of Wilson, Virginia)
- College: Temple (2002–2006)
- NBA draft: 2006: undrafted
- Playing career: 2006–2019
- Position: Power forward

Career history
- 2006–2007: Sioux Falls Skyforce
- 2007–2008: Élan Béarnais Pau-Orthez
- 2008–2011: Cholet
- 2011–2012: Erdemirspor
- 2012–2013: Brindisi
- 2013–2014: VEF Rīga
- 2014–2015: Élan Béarnais Pau-Lacq-Orthez
- 2015–2016: Büyükçekmece
- 2016–2017: Élan Béarnais Pau-Lacq-Orthez
- 2017–2018: Benfica
- 2018: Büyükçekmece
- 2018–2019: Cholet

Career highlights
- Pro A champion (2010)

Antywane Robinson (born July 12, 1984) is an American professional basketball player for Büyükçekmece of the Turkish Basketball Super League.

== Amateur career ==
Robinson started to play in High School at Oak Hill Academy, Virginia. He then joined the NCAA I basketball championship playing for Temple University, Philadelphia between 2002 and 2006. In 4 seasons, he played 116 games averaging 12.7 points and 5 rebounds in his senior season. During his senior season, he was named in the All Atlantic Ten Second Team with Temple University.

== Professional career ==
Being non-drafted at the NBA draft in 2006, he decided to join the D-League and the Sioux Falls Skyforce team. In 49 games there, he averaged 6.4 points and 2.4 rebounds in 16.9 minutes. In 2007, his hopes to join the NBA fainting, he decided to continue his career in Europe and signed in December 2007 for Pau-Orthez in French Pro A.

For the 2008–09 season, Robinson signed with Cholet Basket (Pro A) where he will become a major player of the team under coach Erman Kunter (playing around 28 minutes per game). With Cholet, he also plays European competitions such as the 2008–09 EuroChallenge (reaches the Final), the 2009–10 EuroCup and the 2010–11 Euroleague. In 2010, he won the French Pro A championship with Cholet. In July 2011 he signed a one-year deal with Erdemir SK in Turkey.

On July 22, 2013, Robinson signed with BK VEF Rīga of Latvia for the 2013–14 season.

On June 28, 2014, he signed with his former team Élan Béarnais Pau-Orthez.

On July 1, 2015, he signed with Büyükçekmece Basketbol of the Turkish Basketball Super League.

On July 26, 2016, Robinson returned to Élan Béarnais Pau-Orthez.

On August 23, 2017, Robinson signed with S.L. Benfica for the 2017–18 season.
