= Karlo Vragović =

Croatian basketball player

No. 1 – Dubrava
- Position: Point guard
- League: Croatian League

Personal information
- Born: May 13, 1989 (age 37) Zagreb, SR Croatia, SFR Yugoslavia
- Listed height: 1.92 m (6 ft 4 in)

Career information
- Playing career: 2005–present

Career history
- 2005–2010: Dubrava
- 2010–2012: Cibona
- 2012: Zadar
- 2012–2013: Široki Brijeg
- 2013: Dubrava
- 2013–2014: Široki Brijeg
- 2014–2016: Feni Industries
- 2016–2019: Bursaspor
- 2019–2020: Steaua București
- 2020–2021: Rabotnički
- 2021: Arka Gdynia
- 2021: Cedevita Junior
- 2021–2023: Steaua București
- 2023-present: Dubrava

Karlo Vragović (born May 13, 1989) is a Croatian professional basketball coach and former point guard who currently serves as head coach of Dubrava in the Croatian League.
